= 9th century BC =

One hundred years, from 900 BC to 801 BC

The 9th century BC started the first day of 900 BC and ended the last day of 801 BC. It was a period of great change for several civilizations. In Africa, Carthage is founded by the Phoenicians. In Egypt, a severe flood covers the floor of Luxor temple, and years later, a civil war starts.

It is the beginning of the Iron Age in Central Europe, with the spread of the Proto-Celtic Hallstatt culture, and the Proto-Celtic language.

The major Olmec site of San Lorenzo Tenochtitlán in Mesoamerica declined in importance, after having been active since 15th century BC.

== Events ==
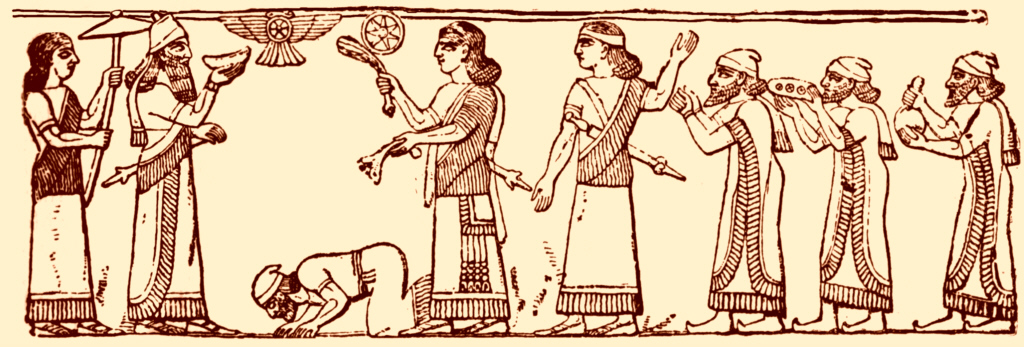
King Jehu of the Kingdom of Israel bows before Shalmaneser III of Assyria.

=== 890s BC ===
- 899 BC: The first year of King Yih of Zhou's reign is marked by a solar eclipse.
- 892 BC: Megacles, King of Athens, dies after a reign of 30 years and is succeeded by his son Diognetus.
- 892 BC: King Xiao of Zhou overthrows King Yih of Zhou and takes the throne.
- 891 BC: Tukulti-Ninurta II succeeds his father Adad-nirari II as king of Assyria.
- 890 BC: Naples some reports and excavations about the foundation of the city

=== 880s BC ===
- 887 BC: Soshenq II succeeds Osorkon I as king of Egypt.
- 885 BC: Takelot I succeeds Soshenq II as king of Egypt.
- 885 BC: King Yi of Zhou, son of King Yih, is restored to the throne.
- 884 BC: Ashurnasirpal II succeeds his father Tukulti-Ninurta II as king of Assyria.

=== 870s BC ===
- ~880 BC: Ashurnasirpal II moves the Assyrian capital from Assur to Nimrud.
- 879 BC: Death of King Yi of Zhou, king of the Zhou dynasty of China.
- 878 BC: King Li of Zhou becomes king of the Zhou dynasty of China.
- 874 BC: Osorkon II succeeds Takelot I as king of the Twenty-second Dynasty of Egypt.
- 874 BC: Ahab becomes king of Kingdom of Israel (approximate date).
- 872 BC: Parshvanatha, 23rd Tirthankara of Jainism was born.
- 872 BC: An exceptionally high flood from the Nile covers the floors of the Temple of Luxor.

=== 860s BC ===
- 865 BC: Kar Kalmaneser was conquered by the Assyrian king Shalmaneser III.
- 864 BC: Diognetus, Archon of Athens, dies after a reign of 28 years and is succeeded by his son Pherecles.
- 860 BC: The kingdom of Urartu is unified.

=== 850s BC ===
- c. 858 BC: Aramu becomes king of Urartu.
- 858 BC: Shalmaneser III succeeds Ashurnasirpal II as king of Assyria.
- 854/3 BC: Battle of Karkar—An indecisive engagement between Assyrian king Shalmaneser III and a military alliance of the king of Damascus and lesser powers including the prince of Tyre. (Either 854 or 853 BC)
- 850 BC: Takelot II ascends to the throne of Upper Egypt
- 850 BC: The Middle Mumun Pottery Period begins in the Korean Peninsula.
- 850 BC: Tagaung Kingdom is founded by Abhiyaza of the Sakya clan of the Buddha, in present-day northern Burma at the upper banks of the Irrawaddy river.

=== 840s BC ===
- 845 BC: Pherecles, Archon of Athens, dies after a reign of 19 years and is succeeded by his son Ariphron.
- 842 BC: Shalmaneser III devastates the territory of Damascus; Kingdom of Israel and the Phoenician cities send tribute.
- 841 BC: Exile of King Li of Zhou, King of the Zhou dynasty of China.
- 841 BC: Records of the Grand Historian regards this year as the first year of consecutive annual dating of Chinese history.
- 841 BC: Ahaziah of Judah and Jehoram of Israel are assassinated, either by the Israelite usurper Jehu, or the newly crowned Hazael of Aram-Damascus, per the Tel Dan stele.
- 840 BC: Gopala Dynasty started in Nepal, first dynasty to rule in a country named Nepal despite its present geographical boundaries.

=== 830s BC ===
- 836 BC: Shalmaneser III of Assyria leads an expedition against the Tabareni.
- 836 BC: Civil war breaks out in Egypt.

=== 820s BC ===
- 827 BC: King Xuan of Zhou becomes King of the Zhou dynasty of China.
- 825 BC: Takelot II, king of Egypt, dies. Crown Prince Osorkon III and Shoshenq III, sons of Takelot, battle for the throne.
- c. 825 BC: Ariphron, King of Athens, dies after a reign of 20 years and is succeeded by his son Thespieus.
- 823 BC: Death of Shalmaneser III, king of Assyria. He is succeeded by his son Shamshi-Adad V.
- 820 BC: Pygmalion ascends the throne of Tyre.

=== 810s BC ===
- 817 BC: Pedubastis I declares himself king of Egypt, founding the Twenty-third Dynasty.
- 814 BC: Carthage is founded by Dido (traditional date).
- 811 BC: Adad-nirari III succeeds his father Shamshi-Adad V as king of Assyria.

=== 800s BC ===
- 804 BC: Adad-nirari III of Assyria conquers Damascus.
- 804 BC: Death of Pedubastis I, pharaoh.
- c. 800 BC: Etruscan civilization.
- Beginning of the Iron Age in Central Europe, spread of the Proto-Celtic Hallstatt culture, and the Proto-Celtic language.
- Adena culture appears in present-day Northeastern United States.

== Inventions, discoveries, introductions ==
- First inscriptions in Epigraphic South Arabian, found in Akkele Guzay
- Olmecs build pyramids.
- Canal for transport constructed in Ancient China.
- Emergence of the Brahmana period of Vedic Sanskrit, probable composition of the Shatapatha Brahmana, and the establishment of the Upanishadic and Vedantic traditions of Hinduism.
- Parshvanath gives Jain philosophy of Karma theory, Vows of Sramana (Ahimsa, Asteya, Aparigraha, Satya)

== In works of fiction ==
- In Highlander, the immortal Juan Sánchez Villa-Lobos Ramírez (Sean Connery) was born in Egypt in 896 BC.
- In True Blood, the vampire known as Russell Edgington was born around 850 BC, and was turned about 800 BC.

== Sovereign states ==
See: List of sovereign states in the 9th century BC.
