= Karomama II =

Karomama
- Queen consort of Egypt
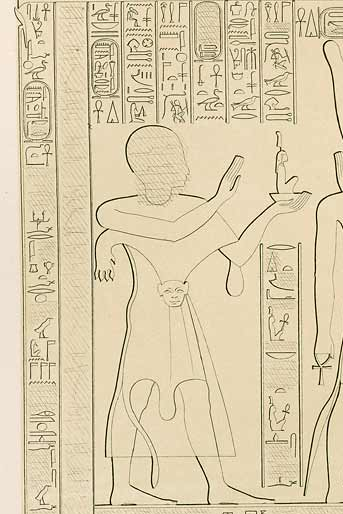
- Karomama's cartouche appears above the figure of her son, the prince Osorkon, at Karnak
- Burial: Thebes?
- Spouse: Pharaoh Takelot II
- Issue: Osorkon III
Names
- Karomama Meritmut
- Dynasty: 22nd – 23rd Dynasty
- Father: High Priest of Amun Nimlot C
- Mother: Tentsepeh C
- Religion: Ancient Egyptian religion

Karomama II (full name Karomama Meritmut; also known as Karomama D, Merytmut II) was an ancient Egyptian queen, Great Royal Wife of pharaoh Takelot II of the 23rd Dynasty of Egypt.

== Family ==
Karomama brought various titles such as King's Wife, King's Daughter, Mistress of Upper and Lower Egypt. She was a daughter of the High Priest of Amun Nimlot C and the lady Tentsepeh C. Her paternal grandparents were pharaoh Osorkon II and queen Djedmutesankh.

Karomama married pharaoh Takelot II and was mother of pharaoh Osorkon III. Karomama also was the grandmother of both pharaohs Takelot III and Rudamun and of the God's Wife of Amun Shepenupet I Karomama is known from the Chronicle of Osorkon B at Karnak and the Nile Quay Texts dating to the reign of her son Osorkon III.

Osorkon II	Djedmutesankh
Nimlot C	Tentsepeh C
Karomama II	Takelot II
Osorkon III
