= Pi-Sekhemkheperre =

Ancient Egyptian stronghold

pr Z1 < ra sxm xpr > niwt
Per-Sekhemkheperre
pr-sḫm-ḫpr-r՚
in hieroglyphs
Era: 3rd Intermediate Period
(1069–664 BC)

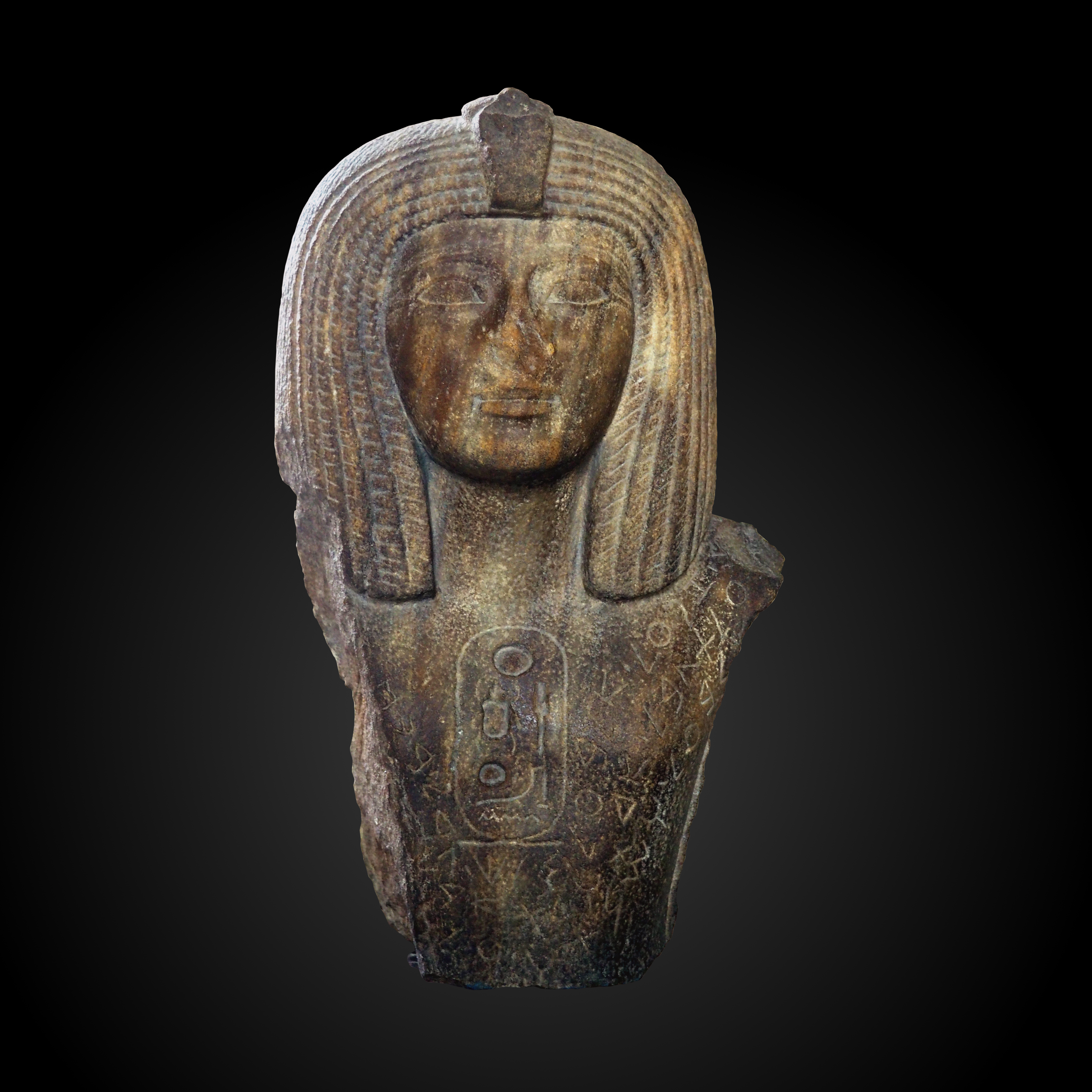
Pharaoh Sekhemkheperre Osorkon I was the founder of Pi-Sekhemkheperre

Pi-Sekhemkheperre or Per-Sekhemkheperre, was an ancient Egyptian stronghold. Its name means "The estate of Sekhemkheperre", a reference to Sekhemkheperre Osorkon I, the pharaoh of the early 22nd Dynasty who founded the fortress during his reign (about 922 to 887 BCE). It has been suggested that its erection may be a symptom of the state of general insecurity in the country during the period.
Pi-Sekhemkheperre is at yet undiscovered but it is believed that it lies somewhere at the entrance of the Faiyum, just north to Herakleopolis Magna in Middle Egypt.

The first known "Chief of Pi-Sekhemkheperre" was Nimlot C – a son of the 22nd Dynasty pharaoh Osorkon II – who also ruled the neighbouring city of Herakleopolis. Shortly after Nimlot's rule, it appears that the fortress shifted allegiance to the rival 23rd Dynasty: it is known that an official named Ewelhon was "Chief of Pi-Sekhemkheperre" in regnal year 6 of pharaoh Pedubast I; still later, the same office was held by the pharaoh-to-be Takelot III.

During the Nubian invasion of the Nile valley led by pharaoh Piye of the 25th Dynasty, Pi-Sekhemkheperre was loyal to the "Chief of the Ma" Tefnakht and his coalition. As stated on his Victory stela, Piye found the stronghold garrisoned but was able to obtain its surrender without bloodshed, also capturing Tefnakht's son in the process.

== Bibliography ==
- Aston, David A. (2005), "Third Intermediate Period, overview", in Bard, Kathryn A. (ed.), Encyclopedia of the Archaeology of Ancient Egypt, London and New York: Routledge, ISBN 0-203-98283-5
- Breasted, James H. (1906). Ancient Records of Egypt. Vol. IV. Chicago.
- Kitchen, Kenneth (1996). The Third Intermediate Period in Egypt (1100–650 BC) (3rd ed.). Warminster: Aris & Phillips Limited. ISBN 0-85668-298-5.
