= Takelot =

V13 V31 D21 U33
Takelot
Tklt
in hieroglyphs
Era: 3rd Intermediate Period
(1069–664 BC)

Takelot was the name of three Egyptian pharaohs:

- Takelot I - 887-874 BC
- Takelot II - 840-815 BC
- Takelot III - 774–759 BC
