= Iuput (disambiguation) =

Iuput in hieroglyphs
E9 p Z7 U33 i
ˁwpwt
Iuput

Iuput or Auput was a personal ancient Egyptian name mainly used during the Third Intermediate Period of Egypt. Some notable bearers were:

- Iuput (A), High priest of Amun in Thebes during the 22nd Dynasty
- Iuput I, pharaoh, coregent of Pedubast I of the 23rd Dynasty
- Iuput II, ruler of Leontopolis at the end of the 23rd Dynasty
