= Harsiese B =

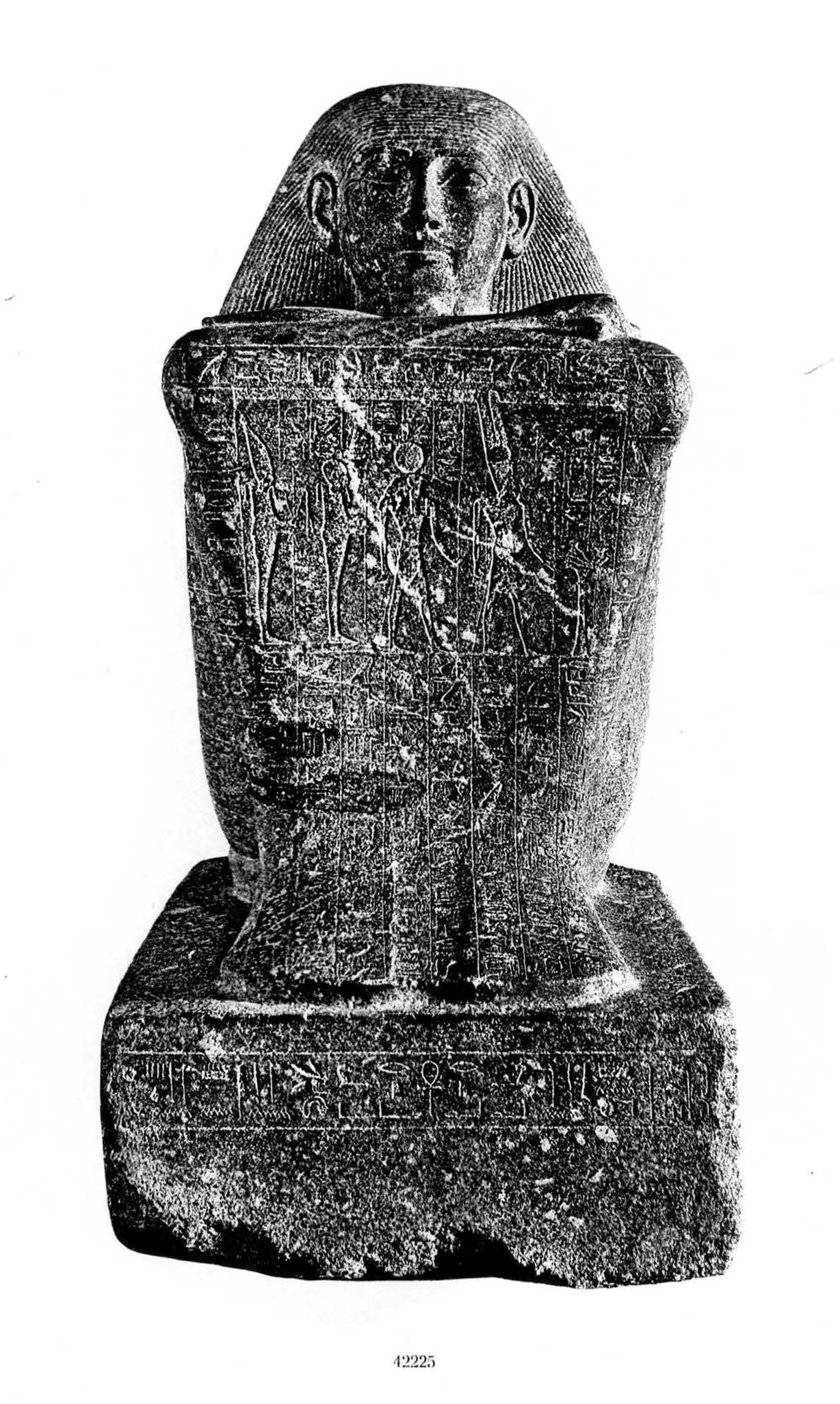
Statue CG 42225 mentioning Harsiese B

Harsiese B was a High Priest of Amun in 874 BC. Earlier Egyptologists assumed he was both the High Priest of Amun (HPA) and son of the High Priest Shoshenq C, who may have become a king at Thebes. However, recent research by Karl Jansen-Winkeln shows that all the monuments of the first (King) Harsiese A demonstrate that he was never Theban High Priest of Amun in his own right, merely a regular Priest of Amun. While the earlier Harsiese was certainly a king at Thebes, he is clearly a different person from the later Harsiese, Harsiese B, who is attested as a High Priest of Amun. Jansen-Winkeln further shows that Harsiese A's son, [...du], was only an ordinary Priest of Amun.

Harsiese B is first explicitly attested as High Priest of Amun late under Osorkon II's reign on Statue CGC 42225, which bears this king's cartouche. He likely assumed the office at Thebes when the current High Priest, Takelot F, proclaimed himself as king Takelot II in the final 3 years of Osorkon II's reign. Statue CGC 42225 was dedicated by the "Letter Writer to Pharaoh", Hor IX, who is mentioned on the walls of Temple J at Karnak. Temple J was built in the final years of Osorkon II's reign by the then serving HPA, Takelot F. Hor IX later served under Pedubast I and Usermaatre Meryamun Shoshenq VI, who were direct contemporaries of Shoshenq III of the Twenty-second Dynasty. Shoshenq III once even dispatched his second son, Pashedbast B, to Thebes where the latter "added a vestibule door to Pylon X at Karnak, dating it to the reign of Pedubast." Hor IX served beyond the 25-year reign of Pedubast I and lived into Shoshenq VI's reign under whom his funerary cones were inscribed. Consequently, the High Priest of Amun Harsiese can only be Harsiese B since he was a close contemporary of Hor IX and served late in office under Osorkon II. In contrast, Harsiese A died before the twelfth regnal year of Osorkon II.

Harsiese B is also attested in office in the sixth regnal year of Shoshenq III in Nile Level Text No.6 and lived into the 18th and 19th regnal years of Pedubast I as Nile Quay Text No.27 shows. During the prolonged civil war which erupted between the forces of Osorkon B and Pedubast I for control of Thebes, Harsiese B sided with Pedubast's faction since the Karnak Quay Texts show he became the latter's High Priest. He died before Year 23 of Pedubast I when this King's new High Priest is revealed to be a Takelot (see Nile Quay Text No.29).

Harsiese B consequently served in office for almost 3 decades under Osorkon II (final three years), Shoshenq III (first 7-8 years) and Pedubast I (at least 18-19 years), and must have been Crown Prince Osorkon B's chief rival for this office at Thebes since he was affiliated with Osorkon's rival. Harsiese B must have been a fairly young man perhaps in his early thirties when he first assumed the Office of High Priest judging by his long career.
