= Karomama =

Karomama (also rendered Karamama, Karomat, Karoma, Karoama, Kamama) is a name for several women from Ancient Egypt most dating to the Twenty-second Dynasty of Egypt:

- Karomama A, wife of Shoshenq I, mother of Osorkon I
- Karomama I, also called Karomama B, King's Wife, King's Daughter, Mistress of Upper and Lower Egypt. Daughter of Takelot I, wife of Osorkon II
- Karomama C, King's Daughter of His Body, Daughter of Osorkon II and Karomama I, who may be the same as Karomama Meritmut
- Karomama Meritmut, Karomama G Merytmut I, God's Wife of Amun, Lady of the Two Lands, Adoratrix. Possibly identical with Karomama C
- Karomama II (Karomama D Merytmut II), Great Royal Wife, Mistress of Upper and Lower Egypt. Daughter of Nimlot C and Tentsepeh. Wife of Takelot II
- Karomama E, Chantress of Amun, daughter of Takelot II
