= Shoshenq VII =

Possible Egyptian Pharaoh of Dynasty XXIII

Pharaoh
- Reign: 755 – 732 BC
- Predecessor: Rudamun ?
- Successor: Ini ?
Royal titulary
Prenomen
Uasnetjerre Setepenre or Hedjkheperre Setepenre
Nomen
Shoshenq Si-Ese Meryamun
- Dynasty: 23rd Dynasty

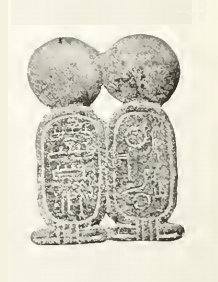

Hedjkheperre Setepenre Shoshenq (VII/VIa) Si-Ese Meryamun may have been an Egyptian king of the 23rd Dynasty, ruling Thebes in the period between the death of Takelot III and the Egyptian campaign of the Nubian king Piye, c. 755–730 BCE. The length of his reign has been estimated variously as between five and twenty-five years. He is poorly attested (Karnak Nile Level Text NLT 3 of year 5 and NLT 45 of year 17, 18 or 25), and his existence remains a matter of some dispute, but his short reign is supported by leading experts on the Third Intermediate Period such as Gerard Broekman and Kenneth Kitchen.
