= Iuput I =

Egyptian pharaoh

Coregent
- Reign: uncertain; late 9th century BC
- Predecessor: Takelot II
- Successor: Osorkon III, perhaps not immediately
Royal titulary
Nomen
Iuput meryamun
Jwpwtj mrj-jmn
Iuput, beloved by Amun

G39 N5	i mn n N36 E9 p Z7 U33 i
- Father: possibly Takelot II
- Dynasty: Branch of 22nd Dynasty

Iuput I (sometimes rendered Auput, Egyptian jwpwtj mrj-jmn or jȝpwty) was an ancient Egyptian king as a member of a branch of the 22nd Dynasty in Upper Egypt, sometimes classified as the 23rd Dynasty.

== Reign ==
The first attestation of King Iuput I comes from a Nile Level Text (no. 26), in which Year 16 of King Pedubast-meryamun is explicitly equated to Year 2 of Iuput-meryamun. This was originally interpreted to indicate that Iuput was the son and co-regent of Pedubast I. Since then, it has been recognized that the apposition of Pedubast I's regnal count with that of another king (such as Shoshenq III in Nile Level Text no. 24) is insufficient grounds for positing a co-regency between the kings involved. This, as well as the apparent coincidence between the end of the reign of Takelot II and the beginning of the reign of Iuput, has led most scholars to reject the previously posited co-regency and relationship between Iuput and Pedubaste. Instead, it now appears that Iuput I succeeded Takelot II and was the latter's son or kinsman, and had preempted Takelot's eldest son, the High Priest of Amun Osorkon B (the future King Osorkon III-siese), in taking the throne. A damaged passage in an inscription recording the flooding of the Luxor Temple in Year 5 of Osorkon III has been restored as naming his brother Iuput (the name is restored), but if so, the historical context of the reference remains unclear. The damaged text of a graffito (no. 81) on the roof of the Temple of Khonsu at Thebes is dated to the reign of "Pharaoh Iu[put ...]-siese", which would likewise group Iuput with Takelot II and Osorkon III, whose names were compounded with the same epithet, meaning "son of Isis".

In addition to Year 2, discussed above, the regnal count of Iuput I is attested at Thebes in Year 9 (graffito no. 244 on the roof of the Temple of Khonsu) and probably Year 12 (graffito no. 245 at the same location). This indicates that, at least at these points in time, the local religious establishment recognized his authority as king. Although three more Nile Level Texts (nos. 28, 27, 29) date from Years 18, 19, and 23 of Pedubast I, in them there is no mention of Iuput I and the latter's regnal count (Years 4, 5, and 9). Nevertheless, like Pedubast I and his apparent successor Shoshenq VI, Iuput I does not appear to have cooperated with his presumably resentful brother, the High Priest Osorkon B. The length of Iuput I's reign remains impossible to determine, but Karl Jansen-Winkeln posits that it could have reached a theoretical Year 18 and to have been immediately followed by the assumption of kingship by the displaced High Priest Osorkon B, as King Osorkon III. On the other hand, Frédéric Payraudeau thought the reign might have reached a theoretical Year 15, ending a few years before the triumph of High Priest Osorkon in Year 39 of Shoshenq III and Osorkon's subsequent assumption of kingship.

The reign of Iuput I is dated generally to the end of the ninth century BC: Jürgen von Beckerath places it in circa 816–800 BC; Erik Hornung, Rolf Krauss, and David Warburton in 820–809 BC; Aidan Dodson in 810–799 BC; Frédéric Payraudeau in 809–798 BC. The dating of the reign can be established precisely in relation to those of Takelot II, Pedubast I, and Shoshenq III, but its absolute chronology depends on the choice of two alternatives for the accession of Takelot II—in 845 BC or 834 BC—and respectively of Shoshenq III—in 841 or 830 BC. In terms of correlation, Year 1 of Iuput I followed immediately upon Year 25 (or possibly 26) of Takelot II and corresponded to Year 15 of Pedubast I, which in turn corresponded to Year 22 of Shoshenq III.

== Bibliography ==
- Beckerath, Jürgen von 1997: Chronologie des Pharaonischen Ägypten, Mainz am Rhein: Philipp von Zabern.
- Dodson, Aidan 2012: Afterglow of Empire: Egypt from the Fall of the New Kingdom to the Saite Renaissance, Cairo: American University in Cairo Press.
- Hornung, Erik, Rolf Krauss, and David Warburton (eds.) 2006: Ancient Egyptian Chronology, Leiden: Brill.
- Jacquet-Gordon, Helen 2003: The Graffiti on the Khonsu Temple Roof at Karnak: A manifestation of personal piety, Chicago: Oriental Institute. The Graffiti on the Khonsu Temple Roof at Karnak: A Manifestation of Personal Piety
- Jansen-Winkeln, Karl 2007, Inschriften der Spätzeit. Teil II: Die 22.–24. Dynastie, Wiesbaden: Harrassowitz.
- Kitchen, Kenneth A. 1995: The Third Intermediate Period in Egypt (1100–650 BC), 3rd ed., Warminster: Aris & Phillips.
- Krauss, Rolf 2015: "Egyptian Chronology: Ramesses II through Shoshenq III, with analysis of the Lunar Dates of Thutmoses III", Ägypten und Levante 25: 335-382.
- Payraudeau, Frédéric 2014: Administration, société et pouvoir à Thèbes sous la XXIIe dynastie bubastide, Cairo: Institut français d'archéologie orientale.
- Payraudeau, Frédéric 2020: L'Égypte et la vallée du Nil Tome 3: Les époques tardives (1069–332 av. J.-C.), Paris: Presses universitaires de France.
- Ritner, Robert K. 2009: The Libyan Anarchy: Inscriptions from Egypt's Third Intermediate Period, Atlanta: Society of Biblical Literature.
