= Shepenupet I =

- Divine Adoratrice of Amun; God's Wife of Amun
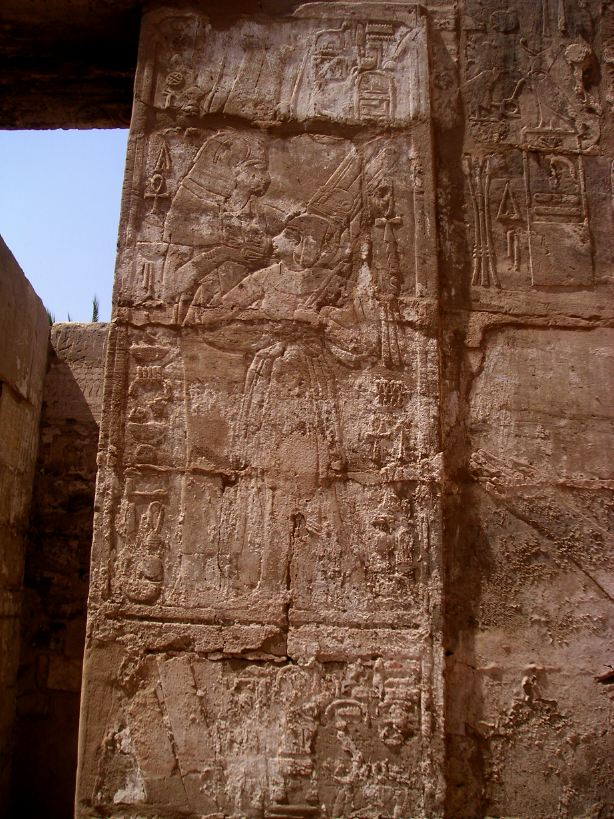
- Shepenupet I at Karnak.
Egyptian name
Royal titulary
Prenomen
< i mn n G17 W9 F34 >
Khenemetibamun
ẖnm(t)-ib-Jmn
She Who is One with the Heart of Amun
Nomen
< G14 N36 N37 p Z9 F13 >
Shepenupet Meritmut
šp-(n)-wp(t) mrjt-mwt
Shepenupet, beloved of Mut
- Predecessor: Karomama Meritmut
- Successor: Amenirdis I
- Dynasty: 23rd Dynasty
- Burial: Medinet Habu
- Father: Osorkon III
- Mother: Karoadjet

Shepenupet I or Shapenewpet I was God's Wife of Amun during the Twenty-third Dynasty of Egypt.

== Biography ==
She was the first “hereditary” God's Wife or Divine Adoratrice of Amun to wield political power in ancient Thebes and its surrounding region. She was the first to take on complete royal titulary with names in two cartouches (her prenomen Khenemetibamun means 'she who is one with the heart of Amun'), and although her successors followed her example, she remained the only one who also bore the royal titles “Lord of the Two Lands” and “Lord of Appearances”, also, the only one whose throne name refers to Amun, not to his wife Mut.

She was the daughter of Osorkon III and Queen Karoadjet, and the (half-)sister of Takelot III and Rudamun. She was God's Wife during her father's whole reign. When Kashta, a Kushite monarch, extended his influence to the Theban area, she was compelled to adopt Kashta's daughter Amenirdis I as her successor and name her as her chosen heir. Shepenupet and Amenirdis are depicted together in Wadi Gasus.

Shepenupet is known to have survived into the reign of Shebitku since she is depicted on a section of a wall Temple J which was decorated under this Nubian king.
