= Iny =

Iny or INY may refer to:

- Ini (pharaoh), a king at Thebes, Egypt, during the 8th century BCE
- I ♥ NY, the basis of a tourism campaign by the city of New York
- Julie Iny, an American activist and author
- Karajá people, a tribe indigenous to the Brazilian Amazon
- The IATA airport code for Inyati Airport
