= Twenty-third Dynasty of Egypt =

Ancient Egyptian dynasty

- 837 BC–728 BC
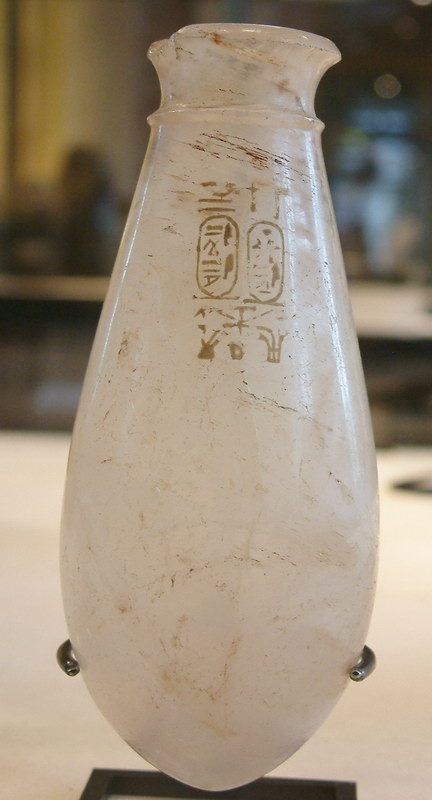
- Flask of Rudamun
- Capital: Thebes, Herakleopolis
- Common languages: Egyptian language
- Religion: Ancient Egyptian Religion
- Government: Absolute monarchy
- Historical era: Third Intermediate Period of Egypt
  - Established: 837 BC
  - Disestablished: 728 BC
Preceded by	Succeeded by
Twenty-second Dynasty of Egypt	Twenty-fourth Dynasty of Egypt

The Twenty-third Dynasty was an Ancient Egyptian dynasty of ancient Libyan origin which is usually classified as the third dynasty of the ancient Egyptian Third Intermediate Period in modern periodization. This dynasty consisted of a number of kings descended from the Ma tribe and ruling over parts of Egypt in the 9th and 8th centuries BC. Scholars are divided on the definition and composition of what they label the 23rd Dynasty.

== Evidence ==
The familiar division of the sequence of Ancient Egyptian kings into dynasties was established by the work of Manetho in the 3rd century BC, as preserved in epitomes or extracts, most notably by Sextus Julius Africanus and Eusebius. According to the fuller epitome of Manetho by Africanus,

The Twenty-third Dynasty consisted of four kings of Tanis.
1. Petoubatēs, for 40 years: in his reign the Olympic festival was first celebrated.
2. Osorkhō, for 8 years: the Egyptians call him Hēraklēs.
3. Psammous, for 10 years.
4. Zēt, for 31 (var. 34) years.
Total, 89 years.

Eusebius' epitome of Manetho, has Petoubastis for 25 years, Osorthōn for 9, Psammous for 10, omits Zēt, and totals 44 years.

== The Twenth-third Dynasty on the model of Kenneth Kitchen ==
There is much debate surrounding this dynasty, which may have been situated at Herakleopolis Magna, Hermopolis Magna, and Thebes. In the main, the following section follows the model created by Egyptologist Kenneth Kitchen, who arranged a number of kings into a single sequence that he tentatively attached to Leontopolis and which ruled parallel to the surviving 22nd Dynasty that reigned from Tanis. The treatment below departs from Kitchen's model in attaching King Harsiese and King Takelot II (now known to be the father of King Osorkon III) to the series.

While the Twenty-third Dynasty is considered a Tanite dynasty, as it originated from the city Tanis, it never reigned from there. The Twenty-second Dynasty, from Bubastis, took over Tanis and Memphis and managed to retain these cities almost until the end of their Dynasty. As a result, the Twenty-third Dynasty, being more or less an offshoot of the Twenty-second Dynasty, originated from Tanis. Instead, as mentioned above, most historians argue that they used Leontopolis as their capital. This is confirmed by Piankhy's stela, which locates Iuput II in Leontopolis. However, some historians argue that Iuput II should not be considered a Twenty-third Dynasty king at all, as it has not been undoubtedly proven that the Twenty-third Dynasty ruled from Leontopolis, merely that Iuput II ruled from somewhere in the Delta. If Iuput II is the only connection between the Twenty-third Dynasty and Leontopolis, this viewpoint would eliminate Piankhy's stela as proof for Leontopolis being the capital of the Twenty-third Dynasty.

Another reason there is much debate is besides the conflicts between Lower and Upper Egypt that existed, there were now also conflicts in the Delta itself. Part of these conflicts were succession struggles, but another part involved the High Priests of Amun at Thebes, who for a period during the Twenty-first Dynasty effectively ruled Upper Egypt, despite not being regarded as a separate dynasty (however, some did become pharaoh as part of a dynasty, like Psusennes I). Although their power declined after the Twenty-first Dynasty, the High Priests of Amun remained powerful and influential, and marriages into the royal family were not unusual. As a result, multiple reigns within the Twenty-third Dynasty as well as between the Twenty-second and Twenty-third Dynasties overlap. This is because some members of the Twenty-third Dynasty reigned as independent kings (like Harsiese A), and as a separate dynasty after Osorkon II's (of the Twenty-second Dynasty) death. Some historians argue that the Twenty-third Dynasty started with Takelot II, and consider Pedubastis I as a separate independent (and short lived) part of that Dynasty. Others consider Takelot II's line as a separate independent part of the Twenty-second Dynasty, and consider Pedubastis I's short lived line as the Twenty-third Dynasty.

When Osorkon II died, crown prince Shoshenq had already died, so his younger brother Takelot II took the throne at Tanis. High priest of Amun at that moment in time was Nimlot, Takelot II's half-brother. Nimlot was appointed by Osorkon II, and Nimlot married his own daughter, Karomama Merytmut II, to Takelot II. As a result, Nimlot would be the grandfather of any children, and thus heirs to the throne, Takelot II would get. When Nimlot died in the eleventh year of Takelot II, a fight for the succession broke out. Takelot II chose prince Osorkon, but Harsiese, grandson of the chief priest, did not agree. Thebes revolted at his hand, but prince Osorkon managed to crush the revolt.

This relative peace lasted four years, as in Takelot II's fifteenth year a civil war broke out. This conflict lasted for almost ten years, and after another two years of relative peace, the Thebans once again revolted. Takelot II died before this new conflict was resolved, and with prince Osorkon far from Tanis, his younger brother Shoshenq III seized power. While this helped in resolving the conflict with Thebes, because they accepted Shoshenq III as king, a new conflict started. Instead of a conflict between royal families, this was from within the royal family. Prince Pedubastis proclaimed himself king, and reigned from Leontopolis, simultaneously with Shoshenq III.

While prince Osorkon was usurped by his brother Shoshenq III, Shoshenq did reappoint him as chief priest of Amun. Because Harsiese, of the Theban revolt above, disappeared in the twenty-ninth year of Shoshenq III's reign, prince Osorkon effectively controlled Upper Egypt for about a decade as chief priest of Amun. Meanwhile, Shoshenq III was and remained more powerful than the kings in Leontopolis. By this time, Pedubastis and his son Iuput, whom he had appointed as co-regent, had already died, seemingly in the same year (804 BC). Shoshenq VI had succeeded Pedubastis, but not for long, as prince Osorkon succeeded him six years later as Osorkon III, reigning simultaneously with Shoshenq III for the last years of his reign.

At Herakleopolis a Twenty-second Dynasty king named Shoshenq V was still in power around 766 BC. However, Osorkon III installed his eldest son Takelot there, also allowing him to be chief priest of Amun at the same time. As a result, the Twenty-second Dynasty's role in the Theban area was greatly reduced. When Osorkon III died, Takelot had been his father's co-regent and was thus now sole ruler.

Takelot III had given up his role as chief priest when he became pharaoh, and his sister, Shepenwepet I, seems to have taken over that role as well as being appointed as Divine Adoratrice of Amun. As a result, she effectively ruled over the Theban region with her brother. Takelot III also gave up his rule of Herakleopolis to Peftjauawhybastet, who was married to a daughter of Rudamon, Takelot's brother. Rudamon succeeded Takelot III, but shortly after was succeeded by Iuput II (also known as Ini/Iny). Under his reign the region became more divided again, as Peftjauawybastet and Nimlot, governor of Hermopolis, adopted royal titles. Rudamon and Iuput II only reigned over Thebes in the final phase of the Twenty-third Dynasty, as Piankhy, king of Napata, put an end to the so-called 'Libyan anarchy'.

== Kings of the 23rd Dynasty according to Kenneth Kitchen ==
Dynasty XXIII Kings of Egypt
Pharaoh	Image	Prenomen (Throne name)	Horus-name	Reign	Consort(s)	Comments
Harsiese A		Hedjkheperre Setpenamun	(unknown)	880 – 860 BC	Isetweret I	Independent King of Thebes; Ruled during Takelot I's and Osorkon II's reigns
Takelot II		Hedjkheperre Setpenre	Kanakhtkhaemwaset	840 – 815 BC	Karomama D Tashep; Tabeketenasket A	Contemporary with the Twenty-Second Dynasty king Shoshenq III, who controlled Lower Egypt.
Pedubast I		Usermaatre Setpenamun	(unknown)	829 – 804 BC		Involved in a prolonged civil war with king Takelot II/Crown Prince Osorkon B.
Iuput I		(unknown)	(unknown)	829 – 804 BC		co-regent
Shoshenq VI		Usermaatre Meryamun	(unknown)	804 – 798 BC		Succeeded Pedubast I at Thebes and ruled Upper Egypt for 6 years.
Osorkon III		Usermaatre Setpenamun	Kanakhtkhaemwaset	798 – 769 BC	Tentsai A Karoatjet	Involved in a civil war against Pedubast I and Shoshenq VI. He triumphed over his opponents and went on to rule Upper Egypt including Thebes for 28 years.
Takelot III		Usermaatre Setepenamun	Wadjtawy	774 – 759 BC	Kakat; Irtiubast	Osorkon III's eldest son, junior coregent and successor.
Rudamun		Usermaatre Setepenamun	Nebmaakheru	759 – 755 BC	Tadi[...]	The younger brother and successor of Takelot III. A poorly attested king.
Shoshenq VII		Hedjkheperre Setepenre	(unknown)	755 – 732 BC		A poorly attested king.
Ini		Menkheperre	(unknown)	720 – 715 BC		Only controlled Thebes during his reign. Possibly a usurper against the 25th dynasty.

== The Twenty-third Dynasty on the post-Kitchen model ==
Kitchen's treatment of the 23rd Dynasty as a unitary line of kings containing most rulers who did not belong in the main line of Tanite monarchs has been repeatedly criticized and seems to be largely abandoned in favor of a definition closer to Manetho's. While there is disagreement over what to call the several parallel lines of kings that reigned alongside the Tanite monarchs, mostly in parts of Upper Egypt, there is increasing consensus in designating as the 23rd Dynasty a line of kings at Tanis who reigned after the death of Shoshenq V, until and beyond the takeovers by Bakenranef of the Saite 24th Dynasty and then by Shabataka of the Kushite 25th Dynasty in 712 BC. The listings vary slightly in details, the following being the comprehensive recent model by Frédéric Payraudeau.

Kings of the Tanite 23rd Dynasty according to Payraudeau

- Sehetepibre Pedubast II = Manetho's Petoubatēs, c. 730–725 BC
- Usermaatre Osorkon IV = Manetho's Osorkhō, c. 725–716 BC
- (interruption by Bakenranef of the 24th Dynasty?)
- Neferkare Pami II = Manetho's Psammous, c. 712–702 BC
- (interruption by the Kushites of the 25th Dynasty?)
- Shepseskare Gemenefkhonsbak
- Sekhemkare (birth name unknown, unless = next)
- Pedubast III (throne name unknown, unless = previous), c. 670 BC

Royal lines in other parts of the country reigning alongside the 22nd and 23rd Dynasties at Tanis are labeled alternately in reference to either the 22nd or 23rd Dynasty by different scholars.

Kings of the Theban Line of the 22nd/23rd Dynasty according to Payraudeau

- Hedjkheperre Harsiese, not necessarily connected to the following, c. 870–860 BC
- Hedjkheperre Takelot II-siese, 834–809 BC
- Iuput I-siese, 809–798 BC
- (interruption by rival line, then Shoshenq III of the 22nd Dynasty)
- Usermaatre Osorkon III-siese, 791–764 BC
- Usermaatre Takelot III-siese, 768–756 BC
- Usermaatre Rudamun-siese, c. 756–750 BC
- Menkheperre Ini-siese, c. 750–745 BC (or later, as rival of the Kushites)

Kings of the Rival Theban Line of the 22nd/23rd Dynasty according to Payraudeau

- Usermaatre Pedubast I-sibaste, 822–799 BC, possibly son of King Harsiese
- Usermaatre-meryamun Shoshenq VI, 799–793 BC

Kings of the Herakleopolitan Line of the 22nd/23rd Dynasty according to Payraudeau

- Neferkare Peftjauawybast, c. 750–720 BC

Kings of the Hermopolitan Line of the 22nd/23rd Dynasty according to Payraudeau

- Neferkheperre Djehutyemhat, c. 745–735 BC (order uncertain)
- Nimlot I, c. 735–720 BC (order uncertain)

Kings of the Leontopolitan Line of the 22nd/23rd Dynasty according to Payraudeau

- Usermaatre Iuput II-sibaste, c. 730–710 BC

== Bibliography ==
- Aston, David A. 2009, Burial Assemblages of Dynasty 21-25: Chronology—Typology—Developments, Vienna: Österreichische Akademie der Wissenchaften.
- Beckerath, Jürgen von 1997, Chronologie des pharaonischen Ägypten, Mainz am Rhein: Philipp von Zabern.
- Broekman, Gerard P.F. 2010, "The Influence of the Tribal Background of the Ruling Class on Political Structures and Developments during the Libyan Period in Egypt", Studien zur Altägyptischen Kultur 39: 85-99. online
- Broekman, Gerard P. F. 2011, "The Egyptian Chronology from the Start of the Twenty-Second until the End of the Twenty-Fifth Dynasty: Facts, Suppositions and Arguments," Journal of Egyptian History 4: 40-80.
- Dodson, Aidan 2012, Afterglow of Empire: Egypt from the Fall of the New Kingdom to the Saite Renaissance, Cairo.
- Elias, J. P. 1995, "A Northern Member of the 'Theban' Twenty-Third Dynasty", Discussions in Egyptology 31: 57-67.
- Goldberg, Jeremy 1994, "The 23rd Dynasty Problem Revisited: Where, When and Who?", Discussions in Egyptology 29: 55-85.
- Hornung, Erik, Rolf Krauss, and David A. Warburton (eds.), Ancient Egyptian Chronology, Leiden: Brill.
- Jacquet Gordon, Helen 1979, "Deux graffiti d'époque libyenne sur le toit du Temple de Khonsu à Karnak" in Hommages à la memoire de Serge Sauneron, 1927-1976, Cairo: 1979: 169–174.
- Jansen-Winkeln, Karl 2006, "The Chronology of the Third Intermediate Period: Dyns. 22–24," in Erik Hornung, Rolf Krauss, and David A. Warburton (eds.), Ancient Egyptian Chronology, Leiden: Brill: 234-263.
- Kitchen, Kenneth A. 1995, The Third Intermediate Period in Egypt (c.1100–650 BC), 3rd ed., Warminster: Aris & Phillips.
- Meffre, Raphaëlle, and Frédéric Payraudeau 2019, "Un nouveau roi à la fin de l'époque libyenne: Pami II," Revue d'égyptologie 69: 147-158.
- Naunton, Christopher 2010, "Libyans and Nubians" in: Alan B. Lloyd (ed.), A Companion to Ancient Egypt, vol. 1, Wiley-Blackwell: 120–139.
- Payraudeau, Frédéric 2020, L'Égypte et la vallée du Nil Tome 3: Les époques tardives (1069–332 av. J.-C.), Paris: Presses universitaires de France.
- Schneider, Thomas 2010, "Contributions to the Chronology of the New Kingdom and the Third Intermediate Period PDF," Ägypten und Levante 20: 373-403.
- Waddell, W. G. (transl.) 1940, Manetho, Cambridge, MA: Loeb Classical Library.

Preceded by Twenty-second Dynasty	Dynasties of Egypt c. 837 BC–728 BC	Succeeded by Twenty-fourth Dynasty
