= Osorkon III =

Egyptian pharaoh

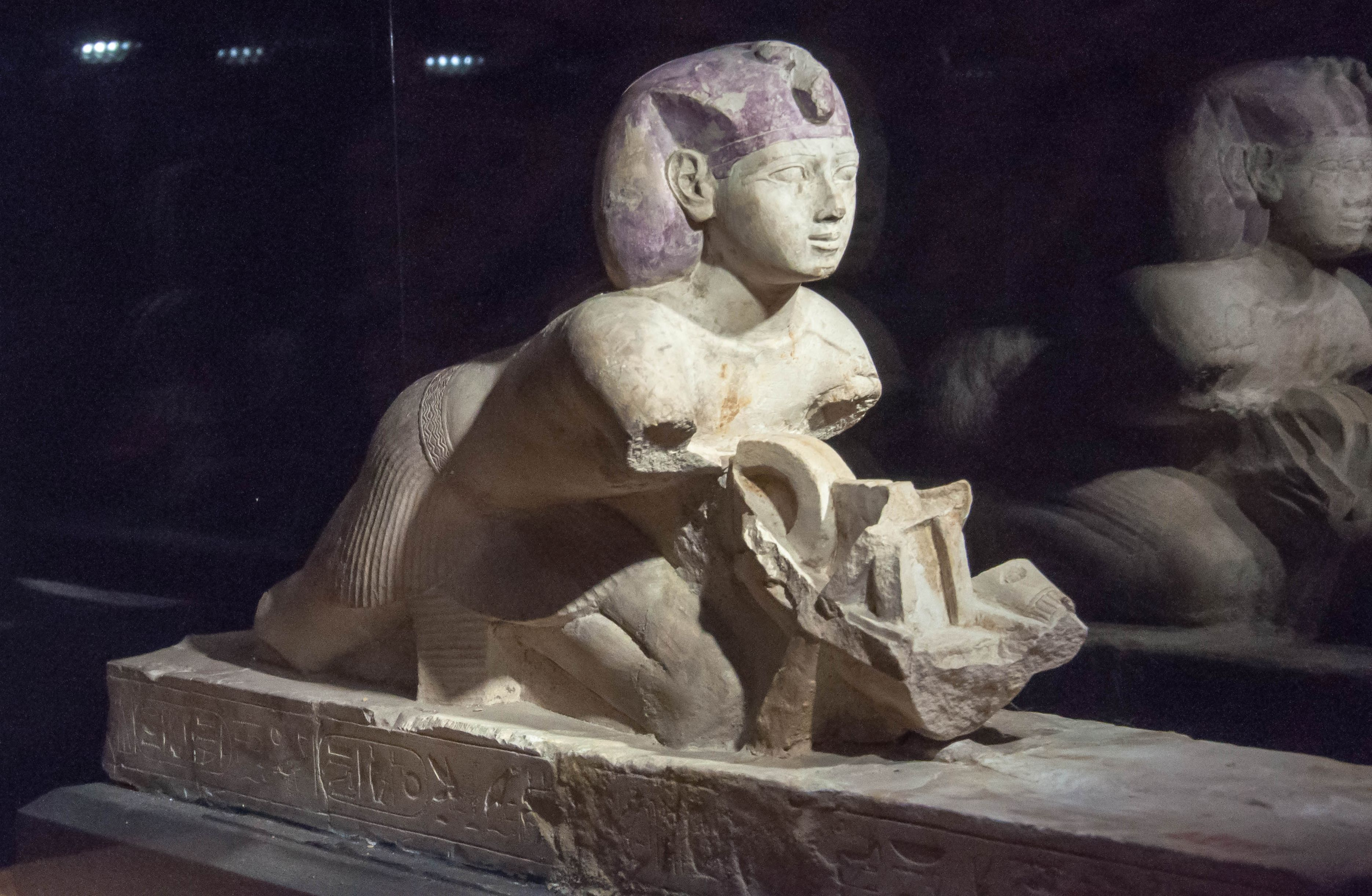
- Kneeling statue of Osorkon III pushing a barque of Seker, from Karnak

Pharaoh
- Reign: 28 years;8th century BC
- Predecessor: Shoshenq VI
- Successor: Takelot III
Royal titulary
Horus name
Kanakht Khaimwaset
K3-nḫt-ḫ3j-m-W3st
Strong bull appearing in Thebes
G5	E1 N28 m R19
Nebty name
Setibtawy
St-jb-tȝwj
The place of the heart of the two lands
G16	Q1 X1 F34 N19
Prenomen
Usermaatre Setepenamun
Wsr-Mȝˁt-Rˁ-stp-n-Jmn
Rich in Maat is Ra, the chosen one of Amun
M23 t L2 t < N5 F12 C10 i mn n U21 n >
Nomen
Userken Meryamun Saiset
Wsrkn-s3-3st-mrj-Jmn
Osorkon, beloved of Amun, son of Isis
G39 N5 < i mn n U6 H8 Z1 Q1 V4 Aa18 M17 D21 V31 N35 >
- Consort: Karoadjet
- Children: Shepenupet I, Takelot III, Rudamun
- Father: Takelot II
- Mother: Karomama II
- Dynasty: 23rd Dynasty

Usermaatre Setepenamun Osorkon III Si-Ese was Pharaoh of Egypt in the 8th Century BC. He is the same person as the Crown Prince and High Priest of Amun Osorkon B, son of Takelot II by his Great Royal Wife Karomama II. Prince Osorkon B is best attested by his Chronicle—which consists of a series of texts documenting his activities at Thebes—on the Bubastite Portal at Karnak. He later reigned as king Osorkon III in Upper Egypt for twenty-eight years after defeating the rival forces of Pedubast I/Shoshenq VI who had apparently resisted the authority of his father here. Osorkon ruled the last five years of his reign in coregency with his son, Takelot III, according to Karnak Nile Level Text No. 13. Osorkon III's formal titulary was long and elaborate: Usermaatre Setepenamun, Osorkon Si-Ese Meryamun, Netjer-Heqa-waset.

== Accession ==
Osorkon III's precise accession date is unknown. Various Egyptologists have suggested it may have been from around the mid-790s BC to as late as 787 BC. The issue is complicated by the fact that Prince Osorkon B did not immediately declare himself king after his successful conquest of Thebes and defeat of Shoshenq VI. This is evidenced by the fact that he dated this seminal event to Year 39 of Shoshenq III rather than Year 1 of his reign. Osorkon III may, therefore, have waited for a minimum of one or two years before proclaiming himself as a Pharaoh of the Theban-based 23rd Dynasty. Osorkon may also have been motivated to defeat or pacify any remaining supporters of the Pedubast I/Shoshenq VI rival faction in other regions of Upper Egypt whether they were in Elephantine, the Western Desert Oasis region—where Pedubast I is monumentally attested—or elsewhere in order to consolidate his position. Hence, Year 1 of Osorkon III is likely equivalent to Year 1 or Year 2 of Shoshenq IV instead, rather than Year 39 of Shoshenq III.

== Identity ==
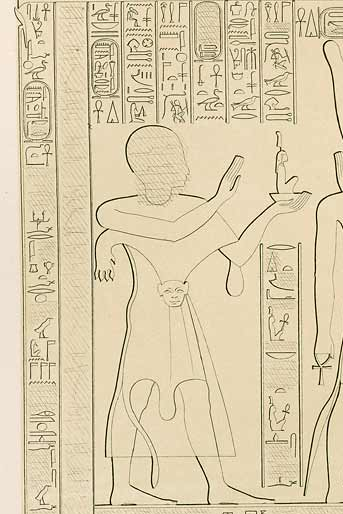
A relief depicting Osorkon in his early career, when he was the High Priest of Amun during the reign of his father Takelot II. The relief also bears his ancestry as a son of queen Karomama II, daughter of Nimlot C, son of Osorkon II.

Osorkon III is attested by numerous impressive donation stelae and stone blocks from Herakleopolis Magna through to Thebes. He is generally thought to have been a contemporary of the Lower Egyptian 22nd Dynasty kings, Shoshenq IV, Pami, and the first decade of Shoshenq V's reign. Osorkon III's chief wife was Queen Karoadjet but his second wife was named Tentsai. A stela of Prince Osorkon B calls his spouse Tent[...] with part of the name being lost. The latter name can be rendered as either Tentsai or Tentamun. Significantly, however, both men have a daughter called Shepenupet.

Secondly, according to Ōhshiro Michinori, Anthony Leahy, and Karl Jansen-Winkeln, an important donation stela discovered in 1982 at Ṭihnā al-Ǧabal (ancient Akoris) reveals that Osorkon III was once a High Priest of Amun in his own right. The document explicitly calls Osorkon III, the High Priest of Amun. Osorkon III, thus, was almost certainly the High Priest Osorkon B, who defeated his father's opponents at Thebes in Year 39 of Shoshenq III, as Leahy notes.

This theory has now been accepted by many Egyptologists, including Jürgen von Beckerath, Karl Jansen-Winkeln, Gerard Broekman, and Aidan Dodson, among others, with the notable exception of Kenneth Kitchen. Aidan Dodson and Dyan Hilton sum up the evidence by noting:

That Osorkon B is the same person as King Osorkon III is indicated by the fact that the former's last appearance as High Priest of Amun seems to directly precede Osorkon III's assumption of the throne, reinforcing a stela from Tehna which mentions the latter with the additional title of High Priest—an unusual occurrence.

Osorkon probably lived into his eighties, which explains why he appointed his son Takelot III as the junior coregent to the throne in his final years. He would have been in failing health by this time. Osorkon III's coregency with Takelot III is the last attested royal coregency in ancient Egyptian history. Later dynasties from Nubia, Sais, and Persia all ruled Egypt with a single king on the throne.

Karnak Nile Level Texts No. 6 and 7, dated to Year 5 and 6 of Osorkon III, calls his mother the "Chief Queen Kamama Merymut." Similarly, Prince Osorkon B's mother was identified as Queen Ka<ra>mama Merymut II, wife of Takelot II. The slightly different renderings of this Queen's name almost certainly refers to the same person here: Osorkon B/III.

== Consorts ==
According to Kenneth Kitchen, Osorkon III's chief consort, Queen Karoadjet, was the mother of Shepenupet I, the God's Wife and Divine Adoratrice of Amun, while his lesser wife Tentsai was the mother of Osorkon III's two sons: Takelot III and Rudamun. However, on a stela erected by Osorkon III at Hermopolis, a male figure appears behind Queen Karoatjet, described as 'born of the Great Royal Wife Karoatjet, beloved of Mut (msw n ḥmt nsw wrt K-r-ṯt mryt Mwt)'; this male figure is identified as Rudamun, and the lady Tentsai was never a wife of Osorkon III, while the mother of Takelot III may also be Karoatjet. Shepenupet I outlived both her brothers as the serving God's Wife of Amun at Thebes and survived into the reign of the Nubian ruler, Shebitku, where she is depicted on the small temple Osiris-Heqa-djet in the Amun precinct of Karnak, which was partially decorated by this king.

== Bibliography ==
- Caminos, Ricardo Augusto (1958). The Chronicle of Prince Osorkon. Roma: Pontificium Institutum Biblicum.
- von Beckerath, Jürgen (1966). "The Nile Level Records at Karnak and Their Importance for the History of the Libyan Period (Dynasties XXII and XXIII)". Journal of the American Research Center in Egypt. 5: 43–55. doi:10.2307/40000171. JSTOR 40000171.
- Redford, Donald B. (1978). "Osorkho... called Herakles". JSSEA. 9: 33–36.
- Leahy, M. Anthony (1990). "Abydos in the Libyan Period". In M. Anthony Leahy (ed.). (ed.). Libya and Egypt c1300–750 BC. London: School of Oriental and African Studies, Centre of Near and Middle Eastern Studies, and The Society for Libyan Studies. pp. 155–200.
- Jansen-Winkeln, Karl (1995). "Historische Probleme der 3. Zwischenzeit" (PDF). Journal of Egyptian Archaeology. 81: 129–149. doi:10.2307/3821812. JSTOR 3821812.
- Jansen-Winkeln, Karl, (2006). 'The Chronology of the Third Intermediate Period: Dyns. 22-24'. In: E. Hornung, R. Krauss and D. A. Warburton (eds), Ancient Egyptian Chronology, pp. 249-253 (Handbook of Oriental Studies [HdO] I vol. 83.) Leiden: Brill.
- 学協会エジプト委員会 [The Paleological Association of Japan inc. (Egyptian Committee)] (1995). Akoris: Report of the Excavations at Akoris in Middle Egypt 1981–1992. 京都 [Kyōto]: 晃洋書房 [Kōyō Shobō].
- von Beckerath, Jürgen (1995). "Beiträge zur Geschichte der Libyerzeit: II. Die Zeit der Osorkon-Chronik". Göttinger Miszellen. 144: 9–13.
- Payraudeau, Frédéric (2014). Administration, société et pouvoir à Thèbes sous la XXIIe dynastie bubastite. Institut français d'archéologie orientale diff. AFPU.
- Kitchen, Kenneth A. (1996). The Third Intermediate Period in Egypt (1100–650 BC) (3rd ed.). Warminster: Aris & Phillips Limited.
- Ōhshiro Michinori [大城 道則] (1999). "The Identity of Osorkon III: The Revival of an Old Theory (Prince Osorkon = Osorkon III)". 古代オリエント博物館紀要 [Bulletin of the Ancient Orient Museum]. 20: 33–49. See PDF
- von Beckerath, Jürgen (1999). Handbuch der ägyptischen Königsnamen (2nd ed.). Mainz am Rhein: Verlag Philipp von Zabern.
- Broekman, Gerardus P. F. (2002). "The Nile Level Records of the Twenty-second and Twenty-third Dynasties in Karnak: A Reconsideration of Their Chronological Order". Journal of Egyptian Archaeology. 88: 163–178. doi:10.2307/3822342. JSTOR 3822342.
- Dodson, Aidan M.; Hilton, Dyan (2004). The Complete Royal Families of Ancient Egypt. Cairo, London, and New York: The American University in Cairo Press and Thames and Hudson. ISBN 977-424-878-3.
- Porter, Robert M. (2011). "Osorkon III of Tanis: the Contemporary of Piye?". Göttinger Miszellen. 230: 111–112.
