= Shoshenq VI =

Egyptian pharaoh

Pharaoh
- Reign: 6 years; c. first half of the 8th century BC
- Predecessor: Pedubast I
- Successor: Osorkon III
Royal titulary
Prenomen
Usermaatre Meryamun
Wsr-Mȝˁt-Rˁ mrj-Jmn
Powerful is the Maat of Ra, beloved of Amun

M23 X1 L2 X1	N5 wsr H6 i mn n N36
Nomen
Shoshenq Meryamun
Šš(n)q mrj-Jmn
Shoshenq, beloved of Amun

G39 N5	i mn n N36 M8 M8 N29
- Dynasty: 23rd Dynasty

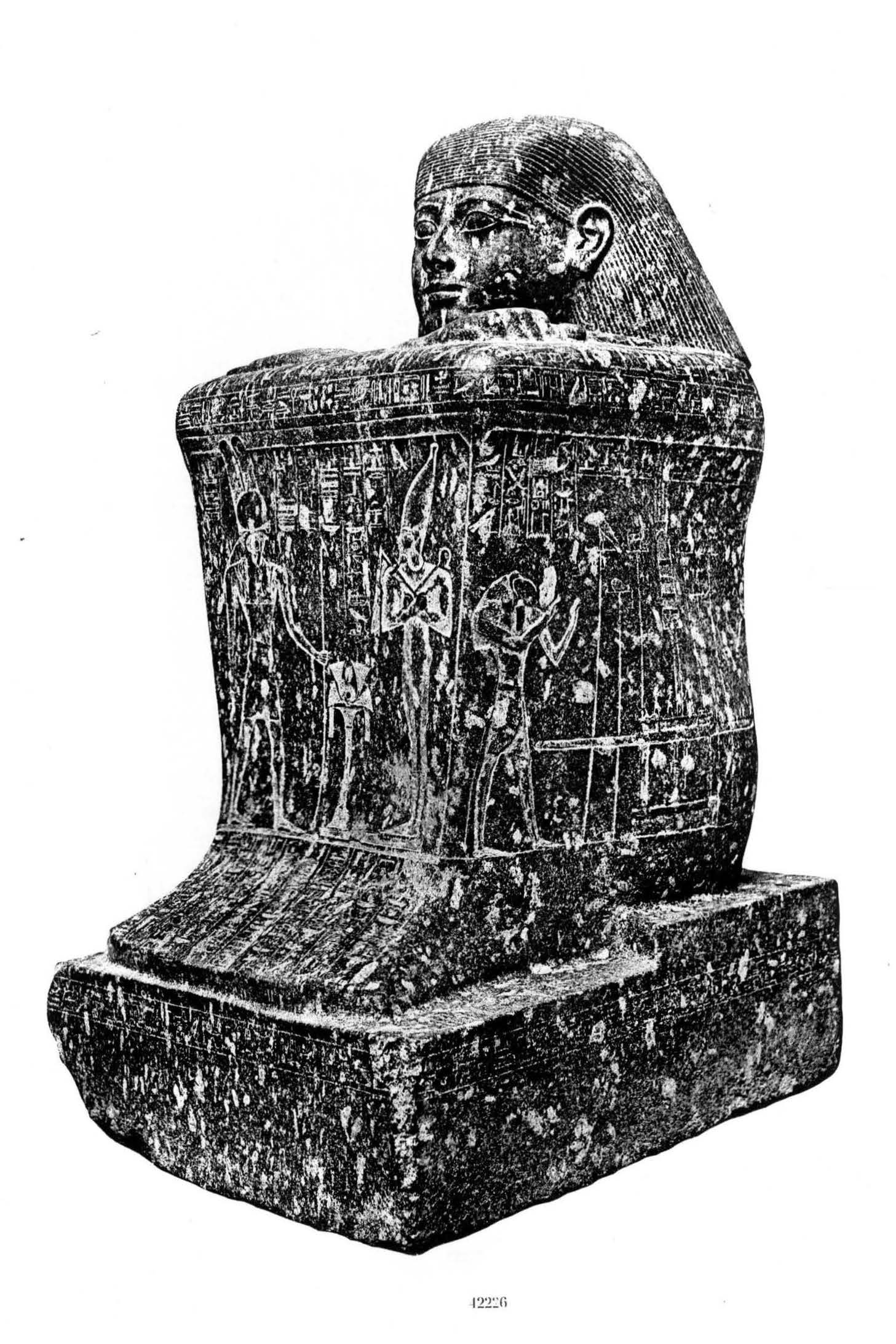
Statue CG 42226 of Hor IX, who died under Shoshenq VI's reign

Shoshenq VI is known to be Pedubast I's immediate successor at Thebes based upon the career of the Letter Writer to Pharaoh Hor IX, who served under Osorkon II and Pedubast I (see Hor IX's statue—CGC 42226—which is explicitly dated to Pedubast's reign). Since Shoshenq VI's prenomen is inscribed on Hor IX's funerary cones, this indicates that Hor IX outlived Pedubast I and made his funeral arrangements under Shoshenq VI instead. His prenomen or royal name was "Usermaatre Meryamun Shoshenq" which is unusual because it is the only known example where the epithet "Meryamun" (Beloved of Amun) appears within a king's cartouche. Shoshenq VI's High Priest of Amun was a certain Takelot who first appears in office in Year 23 of Pedubast I.

Shoshenq VI's Year 4 and Year 6 are attested in an inscription carved on the roof of the Temple of Monthu at Karnak by a certain Djedioh and in Nile Quay Text No.25 respectively. Shoshenq VI was presumably Crown prince Osorkon B's chief rival at Thebes after the death of Pedubast I. He was defeated and ousted from power at Thebes in Year 39 of Shoshenq III by Prince Osorkon B. In this decisive Year, Osorkon B explicitly states in Karnak Priestly Annals No.7 that he and his brother, General Bakenptah of Herakleopolis, conquered Thebes and "overthrew everyone who had fought against them." Thereafter, Shoshenq VI is never heard from again.

(NOTE: The old king Shoshenq IV in pre-1993 books and journal articles has been renamed Shoshenq VI by Egyptologists today because he was a Theban king who is only attested by Upper Egyptian documents. This monarch was never a ruler of the Tanite based 22nd Dynasty of Egypt.)
