= Nimlot C =

Egyptian High Priest of Amun

- High Priest of Amun in Thebes
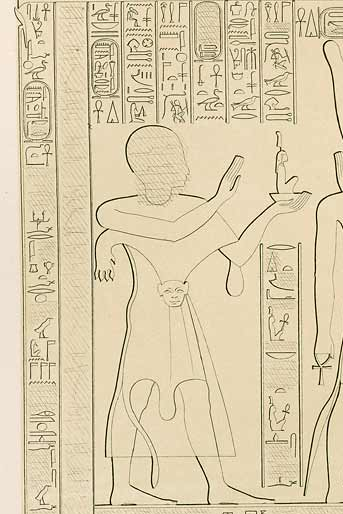
- Osorkon B, grandson of Nimlot C, at Karnak; Nimlot is mentioned in the inscription above him
Egyptian name
n Z2 mA r Z1 V13
- Predecessor: ?
- Successor: Takelot F
- Dynasty: 22nd Dynasty
- Pharaoh: Osorkon II
- Spouse: Tentsepeh C
- Father: Osorkon II
- Mother: Djedmutesankh
- Children: Takelot II, Karomama II, Djedptahefankh, Shepensopdet B

Nimlot C was a High Priest of Amun at Thebes during the reign of pharaoh Osorkon II of the 22nd Dynasty.

== Biography ==
From the stela of Pasenhor it is known that Nimlot C was a son of pharaoh Osorkon II and his queen Djedmutesankh (her name is also found written "Mut-udj-ankhes").

Even before becoming High Priest of Amun he already held various positions such as Count, Governor of Upper Egypt, General and army leader, High Priest of Heryshaf, Chief of Pi-Sekhemkheperre and of Herakleopolis, as shown on the Cairo Museum stele JdE 45327 dating to Year 16 of Osorkon II. After this date he received the office of High Priest of Amun in Thebes, leaving the government of Herakleopolis to one of his sons.

There is no record about his mandate, hence it possibly was quite brief. He died before the end of his father's reign since his son Takelot F (the future king Takelot II) succeeded him in office as High Priest of Amun towards the end of Osorkon II's reign. This is established from the reliefs of Temple J at Karnak which depicts the High Priest Takelot F as the dedicant at a religious ceremony and mentions the ruling king of Egypt as pharaoh Osorkon II. Temple J has been dated to the final years of Osorkon II's reign.

=== Family ===
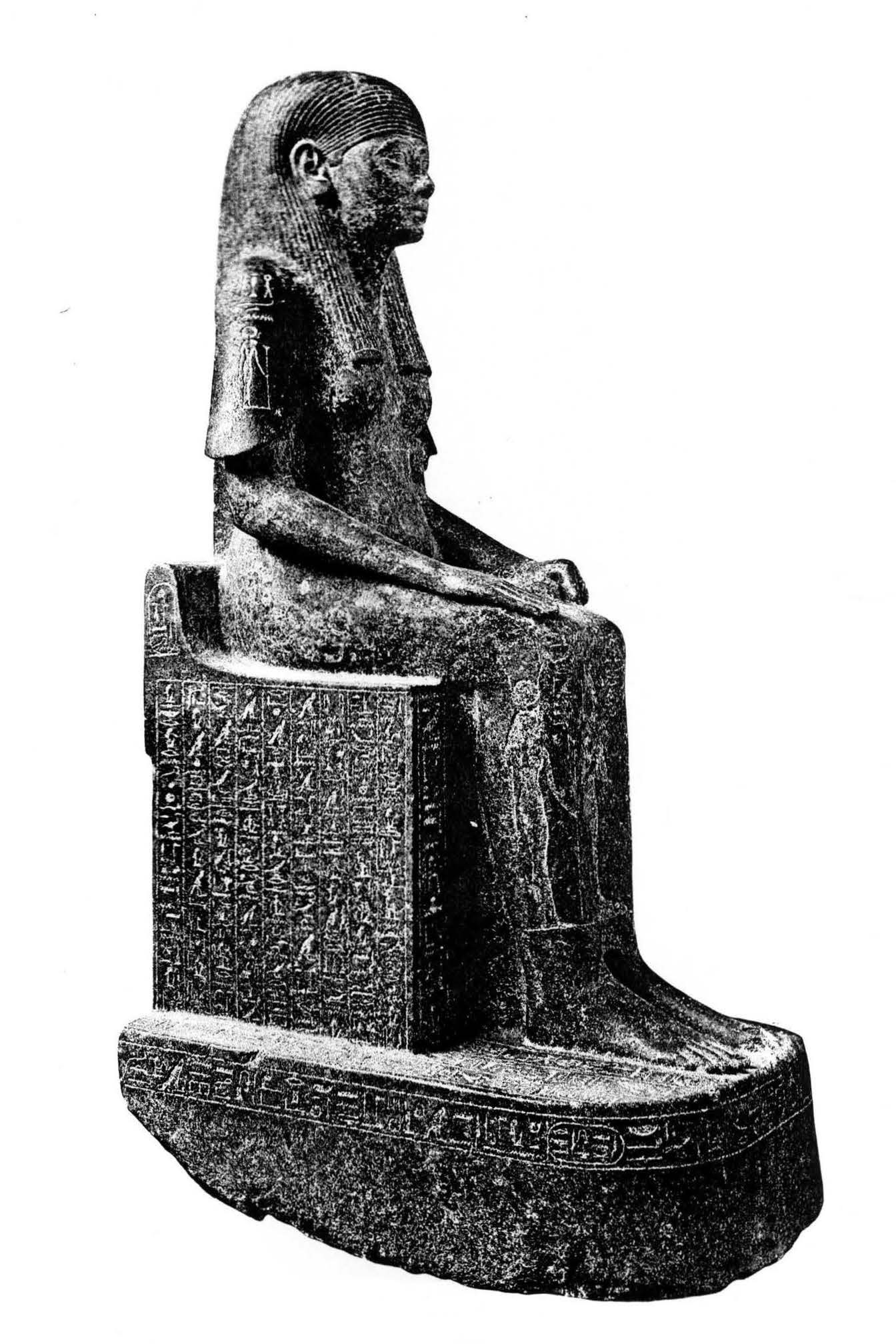
Sitting statue of Shepensopdet B. Cairo Museum CG42228

His family relationships are attested on several monuments. He was married to Tentsepeh C, and was the father of several children:

- Takelot F, his successor as High Priest of Amun and later pharaoh Takelot II;
- Karomama II, later Great Royal Wife of her brother Takelot II;
- Djedptahefankh (also written Ptahudjankhef), his successor as governor of Herakleopolis;
- Shepensopdet B, another daughter.

== Bibliography ==
- Kenneth Kitchen, The Third Intermediate Period in Egypt (1100–650 BC), 1996, Aris & Phillips Limited, Warminster, ISBN 0-85668-298-5
