= Rudamun =

Final pharaoh of the Twenty-third Dynasty of Egypt

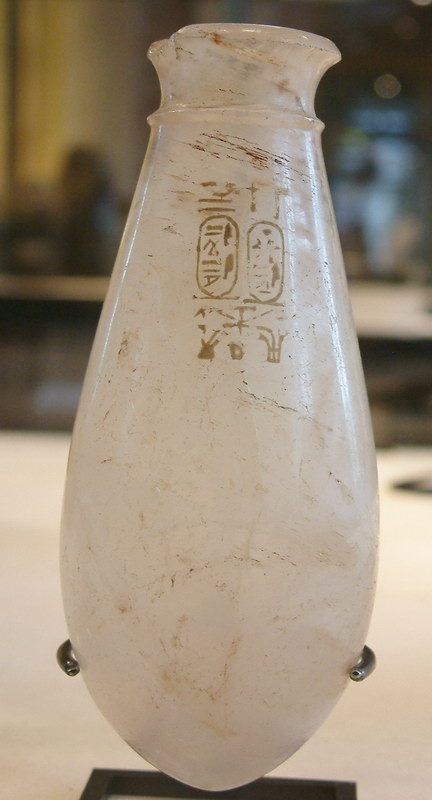
- A small glass vase with the cartouches of Rudamun

Pharaoh
- Reign: 2–3 years; mid-8th century BC
- Predecessor: Takelot III
- Successor: Ini or Shoshenq VII ?
Royal titulary
Prenomen
Usermaatre Setepenamun
Wsr-Mȝˁt-Rˁ-stp-n-Jmn
Powerful is the Maat of Ra, the chosen one of Amun
M23 t L2 t < N5 F12 U1 Aa11 D36 X1 i Y5 n U21 n >
Nomen
Meriamun Rudamun
Mr.j-Jmn rwd-Jmn
Beloved of Amun, Amun is strong

G39 N5	M17 Y5 N35 N36 M17 Y5 N35 T12
- Children: Irbastudjanefu
- Father: Osorkon III
- Died: 739 BC
- Dynasty: 23rd Dynasty

Rudamun was the final pharaoh of the Twenty-third Dynasty of Egypt. His titulary simply reads as Usermaatre Setepenamun, Rudamun Meryamun, and excludes the Si-Ese or Netjer-Heqawaset epithets employed by his father and brother.

== Biography ==
He was the younger son of Osorkon III, and the brother of Takelot III. He is a poorly attested pharaoh of this dynasty according to Kenneth Kitchen, who credits him with a brief reign of about two to three years due to the few contemporary documents known for him. These include a small amount of decorative work done on the Temple of Osiris Heqadjet, several stone blocks from Medinet Habu, and a vase. In recent years, two fragments of a faience statuette bearing Rudamun's name from Hermopolis have been discovered. This recent discovery suggests that Radamun managed to preserve the unity of his father's large kingdom in Upper Egypt ranging from at least Herakleopolis Magna to Thebes during his brief reign.

Some Egyptologists such as David Aston have argued that Rudamun was the anonymous Year 19 king attested at Wadi Gasus. However, new evidence on the Wadi Gasus graffito published by Claus Jurman in 2006 has now redated the graffito to the 25th dynastic Nubian period entirely (rather than to the Libyan era) and demonstrates that they pertain to Amenirdis I and Shepenupet II based on paleographic and other evidence at Karnak rather than the Libyan Shepenupet I and the Nubian Amenirdis I. Jurman notes that no monumental evidence from the Temple of Osiris Heqadjet or Karnak depict Shepenupet I associated with Piye's daughter, Amenirdis I. Another alternative that the Year 19 Wadi Gasus ruler was a certain Shoshenq VII, a new unknown ruler, was proposed by G. Broekman in a paper based on Nile Level Text No. 3 which is dated to Year 5 of a Theban king who ruled after Osorkon III. However, there are serious doubts among scholars as to whether Nile Level Text No. 3 contained the nomen Shoshenq rather than Takelot. Georges Legrain, who had the first opportunity to survey the Karnak Quay Texts, did not, in his 1898 publication of the Quay Texts, read any royal nomen in this inscription since the stone had already been badly eroded. The stone would have been in even worse condition when Von Beckerath inspected the document in 1953 and assumed the surviving traces on the Text No. 3 referred to a king Shoshenq, rather than a Takelot.

Soon after Rudamun's death, his kingdom quickly fragmented into several minor city states under the control of various local kings such as Peftjaubast of Herakleopolis Magna, Nimlot at Hermopolis, and Ini at Thebes. Peftjaubast married Irbastudjanefu, Rudamun's daughter, and was, therefore, Rudamun's son-in-law. Nothing is known about Rudamun's final burial place. The surviving contemporary information from his reign suggests that it was quite brief.
