= Pedubast I =

Egyptian pharaoh

- Pedubast I's bronze torso at the Gulbenkian Museum, Lisbon, Portugal

Pharaoh
- Reign: 835/824 BC–810/799 BC
- Predecessor: Takelot II
- Successor: Shoshenq VI
Royal titulary
Prenomen
Usermaatre Setepenamun
Wsr-M3ˁt-Rˁ-stp-n-Jmn
Powerful is the justice of Ra, the chosen one of Amun
M23 X1 L2 X1 < N5 F12 C10 M17 Y5 n U21 n >
Nomen
Meriamun Padibastet
mry-Jmn p3-dj-Bstt
Beloved of Amun, the gift of Bastet

G39 N5	M17 Y5 n U7 G40 X8 W1 t t
- Children: Iuput I
- Dynasty: 23rd Dynasty

Pedubastis I or Pedubast I was an Upper Egyptian Pharaoh of ancient Egypt during the 9th century BC.

== Biography ==
Based on lunar dates which are known to belong to the reign of his rival Takelot II in Upper Egypt and the fact that Pedubast I first appeared as a local king at Thebes around Year 11 of Takelot II's rule, Pedubast I is today believed to have had his accession date in either 835 BC or 824 BC. This local Pharaoh is recorded as being of Libyan ancestry and ruled Egypt for 25 years according to the redaction of Manetho done by Eusebius. He first became king at Thebes in Year 8 of Shoshenq III and his highest dated Year is his 23rd Year according to Nile Level Text No. 29. This year is equivalent to Year 31 of Shoshenq III of the Tanis based 22nd Dynasty of Egypt; however, since Shoshenq III only controlled Lower Egypt in Memphis and the Delta region, Pedubast and Shoshenq III were not political rivals and may even have established a relationship. Indeed, Shoshenq III's son, the general and army leader Pashedbast B "built a vestibule door to Pylon X at Karnak, and in one and the same commemorative text thereon named his father as [king] Sheshonq (III)" but dated his actions here to Pedubast I. This may show some tacit support for the Pedubast faction by the Tanite-based 22nd dynasty king Shoshenq III.

Pedubast I was the main opponent to Takelot II and later, Osorkon B, of the 23rd Dynasty of Libyan kings of Upper Egypt at Thebes. His accession to power plunged Thebes into a protracted civil war which lasted for nearly three decades between these two competing factions. Each faction had a rival line of High Priests of Amun with Pedubast's being Harsiese B who is attested in office as early as Year 6 of Shoshenq III and then Takelot E who appears in office from Year 23 of Pedubast I. Osorkon B was Pedubast I and Harsiese's chief rival. This conflict is obliquely mentioned in the famous Chronicle of Prince Osorkon at Karnak. He was succeeded in power by Shoshenq VI.

== Pedubast's bronze torso ==
The richly inlaid torso from a bronze statue that originally depicted Pedubast I is today on permanent display in the Calouste Gulbenkian Museum in Lisbon, Portugal and is considered to be one of the great masterpieces of Egyptian Third Intermediate Period Art. This object was purchased by Calouste Gulbenkian from December 13–16, 1921, from Frederik Muller & Cie through the well-known art dealer Joseph Duveen. The Pedubast statue is extremely rare since it is one of the very few large-sized bronze statues of Egyptian kings in existence and the only large surviving bronze one known for the Third Intermediate Period. The restored cartouches on the belt buckle and feather apron read respectively as: "Usermaatre-Chosen-of-Amun, Pedubaste Son-of-Bastet-Beloved of Amun" and "King of Upper and Lower Egypt, Lord of the Two Lands, Usermaatre-Chosen-of-Amun, Son of Re, Lord of Diadems, Pedubastet-Son-of-Bastet-Beloved-of-Amun." This object's provenance is not known but it is first recorded as being in the collection of Count Grigory Stroganoff (1829–1910), a member of the famous Russian family of connoisseurs and collectors, in 1880.
