= Takelot III =

Egyptian pharaoh

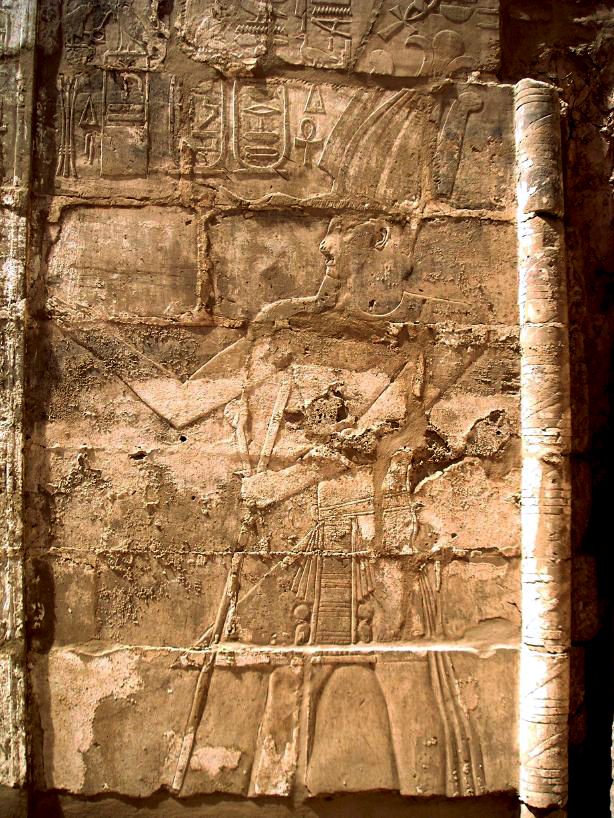
- Relief of Takelot III from Karnak temple

Pharaoh
- Reign: 774 B.C. -759 B.C.
- Predecessor: Osorkon III
- Successor: Rudamun
Royal titulary
Horus name
Hor Wadjtawy
Ḥr-wȝḏ-tȝwj
Horus, flourishing of the two lands
G5	M14 N19
Nebty name
Wadjtawy
Wȝḏ-tȝwj
Flourishing of the two lands
G16	M14 N19
Golden Horus
Wadjtawy
Wȝḏ-tȝwj
Flourishing of the two lands
G8	M14 N19
Prenomen
Usermaatre Setepenamun
Wsr-Mȝˁt-Rˁ-stp-n-Jmn
Powerful is the Maat of Ra, the chosen one of Amun
M23 t L2 t < N5 F12 C10 i mn n U21 n >
Shorter form:
Usermaatre
Wsr-Mȝˁt-Rˁ
Powerful is the Maat of Ra
M23 t L2 t < N5 F12 U1 Aa11 D36 X1 >
Nomen
Takelot Meriamun Siese
Tklt-sȝ-ȝst-mrj-Jmn
Takelot, beloved of Amun, son of Isis
G39 N5 < M17 Y5 N35 U7 Q1 H8 V13 V31 D21 U33 >
Hieroglyphic variant:G39 N5 < N18 V31 D21 Z1 U33 > i mn n U7 H8 Z1 Q1
- Consorts: Irtiubast, Kakat, Betjet
- Father: Osorkon III
- Dynasty: 23rd Dynasty

Usermaatre Setepenamun Takelot III Si-Ese (reigned 774–759 BC) was Osorkon III's eldest son and successor. Takelot III ruled the first five years of his reign in a coregency with his father, according to the evidence from Nile Quay Text No.13 (which equates Year 28 of Osorkon III to Year 5 of Takelot III), and succeeded his father as king the following year. He served previously as the High Priest of Amun at Thebes. He was previously thought to have ruled Egypt for only 7 years until his 13th Year was found on a stela from Ahmeida in the Dakhla Oasis in 2005.

== Reign length ==
Takelot is attested by several documents: a donation stela from Gurob which calls him "The First Prophet of Amun-Re, General and Commander Takelot," a stone block from Herakleopolis which calls him 'the Chief of Pi-Sekhemkheperre' and king's son by Tentsai, Quay Text No.13, as noted above, and Quay Text No.4 which records his Year 6.

A graffito on the roof of the Temple of Khonsu which records his Year 7, was long believed to be his Highest Year date. However, in February 2005, a hieratic stela from Year 13 of his reign was discovered by a Columbia University archaeological expedition in the ruins of a temple at Amheida the Dakhla Oasis. Their subsequent analysis of this dated document conclusively established this king's identity as Takelot III. This document—which measures "between 42-48 cm wide; between 47-51 cm high; [and] between 10-16 cm thick"—has now been published in JEOL 39 (2006) by Dr. Olaf Kaper and Robert Demarée. Part of the abstract for their article is given below:

...The stela belongs to a group of finds documenting the temple of the God Thoth...[in the western part of the Dakhla Oasis]...during the Third Intermediate Period. One block of temple decoration was found in the name of king Petubastis (I), and the stela under discussion was set up in the temple to which this block belonged. The stela's principal text has five lines, in which the date of the stela is given as Year 13 of Takeloth III (c. 740 BCE), as well as the name of the god Thoth of SA-wHAt, the local deity. The stela records a land donation to the temple on the part of the local governor, chief of a Libyan tribe, and it concludes with a list of eleven priests who are beneficiaries of this donation....Another donation stela erected by the same governor is known from the temple of Seth in Mut (Dakhleh).

The governor mentioned here is Nes-Djehuti or Esdhuti who appears as the Chief of the Shamin Libyans in both the aforementioned Year 13 stela of Takelot III and also in the Smaller Dakhla Stela. The smaller Dakla stela dates to Year 24 of the Nubian king Piye. This could mean that Takelot III and Piye were near contemporaries during their respective reigns. It suggested that an important graffito at Wadi Gasus—which apparently links the God's Wife Amenirdis I (hence Shabaka here) to Year 19 of a God's Wife Shepenupet—is a synchronism between a Nubian ruler and an Upper Egyptian Libyan king thereby equating Year 12 of Shabaka to Takelot III (rather than the short-lived Rudamun). This graffito would have been carved prior to Piye's Nubian conquest of Egypt in his 20th Year—by which time both Takelot III and Rudamun had already died. However, new evidence on the Wadi Gasus graffito published by Claus Jurman in 2006 has now redated the carving to the 25th dynastic Nubian period entirely—to Year 12 of Shabaka and Year 19 of Taharqa rather than to the 23rd dynastic Libyan era—and demonstrates that they instead pertain to Amenirdis I and Shepenupet II respectively based on palaeographic and other evidence collated by Jurman at Karnak rather than the Nubian Amenirdis I and the Libyan Shepenupet I, daughter of Osorkon III. The God's Wife Shepenupet II was Piye's daughter and Taharqa's sister. Jurman notes that no evidence from the innermost sanctuary of the chapel of Osiris Heqadjet at Karnak shows Shepenupet I associated with Piye's daughter, Amenirdis I. The Wadi Gasus graffiti were written in 2 separate handstyles and the year date formulas for '12' and '19' were also written differently which suggests that they are unlikely to have been composed at the same time. This means that the Year 19 date cannot be assigned to Takelot III and likely belongs to the Nubian king Taharqa instead.

== Papyrus Berlin 3048 ==
Frédéric Payraudeau once noted that Takelot III likely ruled Egypt for a minimum of 14 Years and was possibly the unknown Year 19 Egyptian monarch recorded at Wadi Gasus. He based his interpretation on the evidence of Papyrus Berlin 3048, the only surviving administrative document on papyri for the entire Libyan period. This document, which is explicitly dated to Year 14 of a Takelot Si-Ese Meryamun (i.e., either Takelot II or III), records a marriage contract which was witnessed by Vizier Hor, and 2 Royal Treasurers: Bakenamun and Djedmontuiufankh, respectively. The papyrus has traditionally been assigned to Takelot II since this ruler's highest date is his Year 25, whereas Takelot III's highest unequivocal date was only thought to be his Year 7. The author observed 3 pieces of evidence which, taken together, could have supported the attribution of this papyrus to Takelot III instead.

Firstly, Payraudeau stressed that Papyrus Berlin 3048 specifically mentions two Royal treasurers. The fact that 2 treasurers served Pharaoh at the same time is inconsistent with the known facts for the period from the reign of Osorkon II until the early years of Osorkon III at Thebes, when only a single person from one influential family served in this office. They were the descendants of Djedkhonsuiufankh A, who was the Fourth Prophet of Amun under Takelot I: Nakhtefmut A, Harsiese C and Djedkhonsuiufankh C. Djedkhonsuiufankh A's son, Nakhtefmut A, first assumed the office of Royal Treasurer under Osorkon II; then Nakhtefmut A's son, Harsiese C, in turn succeeded him (likely under Takelot II). Finally, Harsiese C's son, Djedkhonsuiufankh C, occupied this office from the end of Takelot II's reign until the early years of Osorkon III's reign under whom he is attested. Since three direct descendants of one powerful family held the office of Royal Treasurer in the period around Takelot II's reign, it is unlikely that Djedmontuiufankh could have intervened in office as early as Year 14 of Takelot II since he was not even connected to this family. Hence, the only other viable candidate for Djedmontuiufankh's master was Takelot III for whom no Royal Treasurer is known with certainty. Secondly, the Vizier Hor who is mentioned in Papyrus Berlin 3048 was thought to be the same person who is named as the father of Vizier Nebneterou in several Nubian and Saite era genealogical documents. This also would have made it far more plausible that P. Berlin 3048 belonged to Takelot III since Hor would have served as Vizier only a few years prior to the start of the Nubian Dynasty in Egypt under Piye and would explain his son's later attestations in Nubian and Saite documents. In contrast, Takelot II died long before Piye conquered Egypt in his 20th Year.

Finally, the author noted that the Royal Treasurer Djedmontuiufankh, son of Aafenmut II, lists his family genealogy on the opposite side of this papyrus. (Payraudeau: 84-85) This specific list of his family tree is given:

Harsiese→Bakenkhonsu→Harsiese→Aafenmut I→Merkhonsu→Harsiese→(name lost)→Harsiese→Aafenmut II→Djedmontuiufankh→Harsiese.

An Aafenmut, a scribe of the Chief Treasurer, was buried under Osorkon I (bracelets on his Mummy bore this king's prenomen). Frederic notes that an identification of this person with one of the listed predecessors of Djedmontuiufankh is certain here since this person functioned as a 'scribe of the Treasury'--a state office with which Djedmontuiufankh's family was intimately linked. This Aafenmut was presumably Aafenmut I rather than Aafenmut II, Djedmontuiufankh's father, since this person's son could not have lived beyond three family generations (under Takelot I, Osorkon II and the High Priest Nimlot C) from the reign of Osorkon I into Year 14 of Takelot II, as the author noted.

However, Frederic Payraudeau has since changed his views here and now assigns this papyrus to Takelot II based on the mention of a certain Harsiese—designated the fourth prophet of Amun—in this document, who is known to have served in office during king Takelot II's reign. This means that Takelot III's highest date remains his 13th year. The fact that the chief of the Shamin-Libyans, a Nes-Djehuti, is attested in the same office in both Year 13 of Takelot III and Year 24 of Piye also shows that the interval between these two kings' dates was close in time; also, it is unlikely that Takelot III ruled Egypt for 19 years since his brother Rudamun succeeded him at Thebes and Rudamun, in turn, was succeeded in this city by king Ini who ruled here for at least 5 years before Thebes fell permanently under Kushite control during Piye's reign.

Regarding the genealogical information for the family of the Royal Treasurer Djedmontuiufankh, Payraudeau states: "It is probably more secure to allocate the year dates in the papyrus (years 13, 16, 23 and even 26) to Takeloth II and not to Takeloth III, even if some questions remain unsolved. The treasurer Djedmontuiufankh would have been in office during Takeloth II's reign. He cannot be the brother of Ankhkhonsu, because his statue cannot be dated to the mid-22nd Dynasty. So, we should assume that this Ankhkhonsu was a later member of the same family, his grandfather Harsiese could even be the son of Djedmontuiufankh, putting him in the generation just after Takeloth III."

== Successor ==
Takelot III was the husband of Irtiubast who is named "as a King's Daughter on the coffin of their son, Osorkon G." Another Irtiubast ("B") appears to be a daughter of the king. He was ultimately succeeded in power by his younger brother Rudamun, who was another son of Osorkon III rather than by any of his 3 known sons: the Prince/High Priest Osorkon F, a Prince Ihtesamun who is known from the stela of his grandson Ankhfenmut in Croydon Central Library and, finally, the Second Prophet of Amun, Djedptahefankh D who is attested in statue Tübingen 1734 and in stela CG 41006 of his great-granddaughter Nakhtbasteru. This development suggests that Takelot III must have reached an advanced age to have outlived all of his sons since it was unusual for a brother of a king to assume the throne if the king still had a son who was living. Traditional Egyptian custom required that the son of a king directly succeed his father.

== Bibliography ==
- D.A. Aston & J.H. Taylor, "The Family of Takelot III and the "Theban" Twenty-Third Dynasty," in M.A. Leahy, 'Libya and Egypt c.1300–750 BC.' London: School of Oriental and African Studies, Centre of Near and Middle Eastern Studies, and The Society for Libyan Studies (1990)
- Gerard Broekman, "The Nile Level Records of the Twenty-Second and Twenty-Third Dynasties in Karnak: A Reconsideration of their Chronological Order," JEA 88(2002), pp. 165–178.
- Aidan Dodson & Dyan Hilton, The Complete Royal Families of Ancient Egypt, Thames & Hudson (2004)
- J.P. Elias, "A Northern Member of the 'Theban' Twenty-Third Dynasty", Discussions in Egyptology 31 (1995), 57-67.
- Olaf Kaper & Robert Demarée, "A Donation Stela in the Name of Takeloth III from Amheida, Dakhleh Oasis," Jaarbericht Ex Oriente Lux (JEOL) 39 [2006], pp.19-37
- Olaf E. Kaper,, Epigraphic Evidence from the Dakhleh Oasis in the Libyan Period PDF in The Libyan Period in Egypt Historical and Cultural Studies into the 21TH – 24TH Dynasties: Proceedings of a Conference at Leiden University, 25-27 October 2007, G.P.F. BROEKMAN, R.J. DEMARÉE and O.E. KAPER (editors), Leiden 2009, pp.149-159 PDF
- K.A. Kitchen, The Third Intermediate Period in Egypt (c.1100—650 BC), 3rd ed., Warminster: 1996.
- Frédéric Payraudeau, "Le règne de Takélot III et les débuts de la domination Koushite," GM 198(2004) pp. 79–90.1.
