= Takelot II =

Egyptian Pharaoh

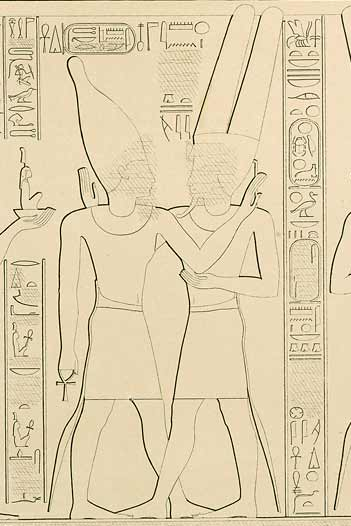
- Takelot II (left) and Amun-Ra at Karnak

Pharaoh
- Reign: 845/834 – 820/809 BC
- Predecessor: Harsiese A
- Successor: Pedubast I
Royal titulary
Horus name
Kanakht Khaiemwaset
Kꜣ-nḫt ḫꜥj-m-Wꜣst
The strong bull who appears in Thebes
G5	E1 D40 N28 G17 R19
Prenomen
Hedjkheperre Setepenre
ḥḏ-ḫpr-Rꜥ stp.n-Rꜥ
Radiant is the manifestation of Ra, the chosen one of Ra

M23 X1 L2 X1	N5 S1 L1 N5 U21 n
Nomen
Takelot-siese-meramun
Tklt zꜣ-Ꜣst mrj-Jmn
Takelot, son of Isis, beloved of Amun

G39 N5	M17 Y5 N35 U7 Q1 H8 V13 V31 D21 U33
- Consorts: Karomama Merytmut II, Karomama D, Tashep, Tabeketenasket A
- Children: Osorkon III, Iuput I ?, Bakenptah, Nimlot, Isetweret, DjedPtahefankh ?, Shebensopdet II ?, Karomama ?, Tentsepeh ?, Irbastudjatjau ?, Deersenesyt ?
- Father: Nimlot C
- Dynasty: 23rd Dynasty

Hedjkheperre Setepenre Takelot II Si-Ese was a pharaoh of the Twenty-third Dynasty of Ancient Egypt in Middle and Upper Egypt. He has been identified as the High Priest of Amun Takelot F, son of the High Priest of Amun Nimlot C at Thebes, and thus, the son of Nimlot C and grandson of king Osorkon II, according to the latest academic research. Based on two lunar dates belonging to Takelot II, this Upper Egyptian pharaoh is today believed to have ascended to the throne of a divided Egypt in either 845 BC or 834 BC. Most Egyptologists today, including Aidan Dodson, Gerard Broekman, Jürgen von Beckerath, M.A. Leahy, and Karl Jansen-Winkeln, also accept David Aston's 1989 hypothesis that Shoshenq III was Osorkon II's actual successor at Tanis, rather than Takelot II. As Aidan Dodson and Dyan Hilton write in their comprehensive book on the royal families of Ancient Egypt:

Takelot II is likely to have been identical with the High Priest Takelot F, who is stated in [the] Karnak inscriptions to have been a son of Nimlot C, and whose likely period of office falls neatly just before Takelot II's appearance.

Takelot II rather ruled a separate kingdom that embraced Middle and Upper Egypt, distinct from the Tanite Twenty-second Dynasty, which only controlled Lower Egypt. Takelot F, the son and successor of the High Priest of Amun Nimlot C, served for a period of time under Osorkon II as a High Priest of Amun, before he proclaimed himself as king Takelot II in the final three regnal years of Osorkon II. This situation is attested by the relief scenes on the walls of Temple J at Karnak which was dedicated by Takelot F – in his position as High Priest – to Osorkon II, who is depicted as the celebrant and king. All the documents which mention Takelot II Si-Ese and his son, Osorkon B, originate from either Middle or Upper Egypt (none from Lower Egypt) and a royal tomb at Tanis, which named a king Hedjkheperre Setepenre Takelot along with a Year 9 stela from Bubastis are now recognised as belonging exclusively to Takelot I. While both Takelot I and II used the same prenomen, Takelot II added the epithet Si-Ese ("Son of Isis") to his royal titulary both to affiliate himself with Thebes and to distinguish his name from Takelot I.

== The Crown Prince Osorkon ==
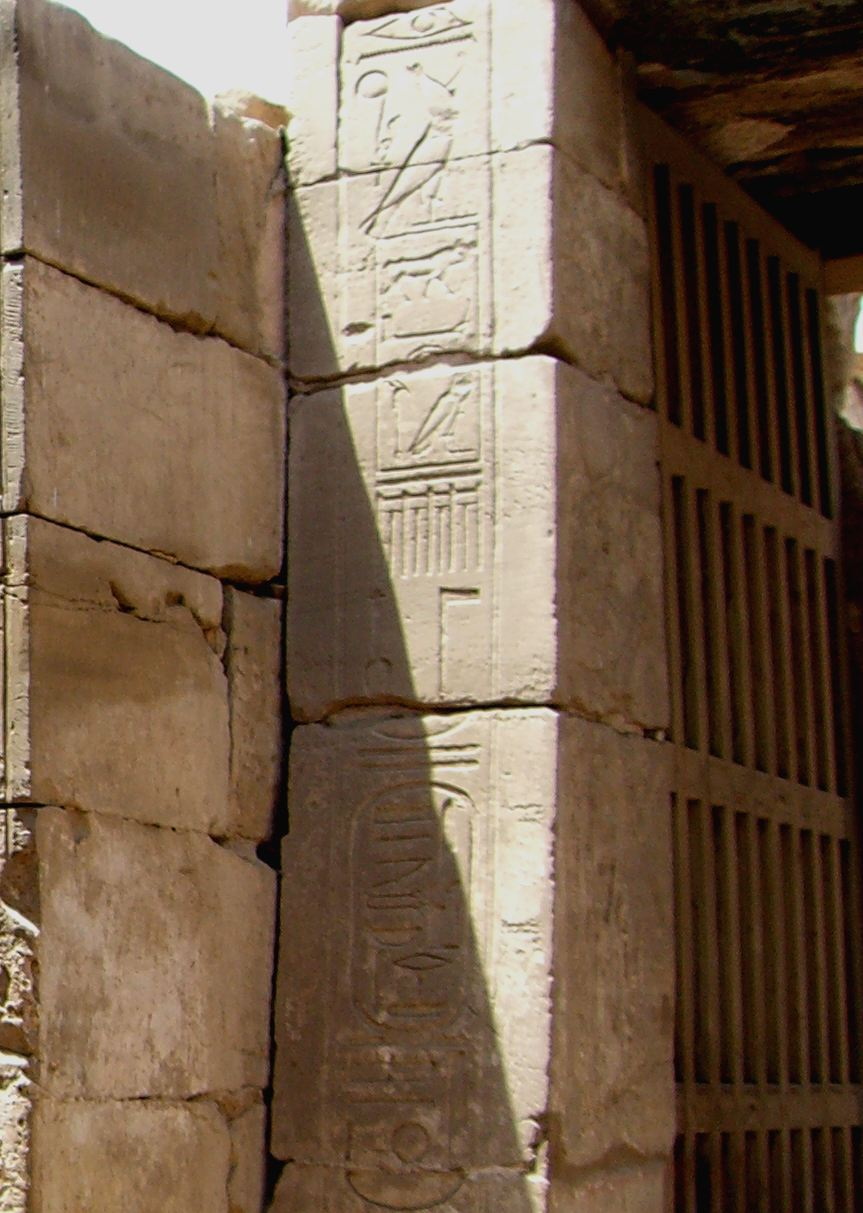
Titulary of Takelot II on a doorway in the temple of Ptah at Karnak.

Takelot II controlled Middle and Upper Egypt during the final 3 Years of Osorkon II and the first 2 decades of Shoshenq III. The majority of Egyptologists today concede that king Osorkon III was the illustrious "Crown Prince and High Priest Osorkon B," son of Takelot II. A misunderstanding arose over his identity because in the Crown Prince's Chronicle, which was carved on the Bubastite Portal at Karnak, Osorkon dates his actions by both the regnal years of Takelot II (years 11 through 24) – with a short year 25 left unmentioned – and then by those of the Tanite king, Shoshenq III (from regnal years 22 through 29). While Kenneth Kitchen has interpreted this to mean that Shoshenq III succeeded Takelot II at Tanis, in fact Takelot II and Shoshenq III were likely close contemporaries because immediately after the death of his father in year 25 of Takelot II, Osorkon B started dating his activities to year 22, and not year 1, of Shoshenq III onwards. Consequently, there was never a two decade long break in Osorkon B's struggle to regain control of Thebes (from Year 1 to Year 22 of Shoshenq III) as Kitchen's chronology implies because year 25 of Takelot II is equivalent to year 22 of Shoshenq III. Osorkon B did not immediately ascend to his father's throne presumably because he was involved in a prolonged civil war with his rival Pedubast I and, later, Shoshenq VI, for control of Thebes. Instead, he merely dated his activities to the serving Dynasty 22 Pharaoh at Tanis: Shoshenq III.

The Crown Prince Osorkon B was not outmaneuvered to the throne of Tanis by Shoshenq III because both men ruled over separate kingdoms with the 22nd Dynasty controlling Lower Egypt, and Takelot II/Osorkon B ruling over most of Upper Egypt from Herakleopolis Magna to Thebes, where they are monumentally attested. In 1983, a donation stela was discovered by Japanese excavators (Heian Museum 1983) at Tehna which reveals that Osorkon III was once a High Priest of Amun himself. This person can only be the well-known High Priest Osorkon B since no other Theban High Priests named Osorkon are known until the reign of Takelot III half a century later when the latter's son Osorkon F served in this office.

== Theban Uprising and Conflict ==
In Year 11 of Takelot II, an insurrection began under Pedubast I whose followers challenged this king's authority at Thebes. Takelot reacted by dispatching his son, Osorkon B, to sail southwards to Thebes and quell the uprising. Osorkon B succeeded in retaining control of the city and then proclaimed himself as the new High Priest of Amun. Some of the rebels' bodies were deliberately burned by Osorkon to permanently deny their souls any hope of an afterlife. However, just four years later, in year 15 of Takelot II, a second major revolt broke out and this time Osorkon B's forces were expelled from Thebes by Pedubast I. This caused a prolonged period of turmoil and instability in Upper Egypt as a prolonged struggle broke out between the competing factions of Takelot II/Osorkon B and Pedubast I/Shoshenq VI for control of Thebes. This conflict would last for 27 long years – from Year 15 to Year 25 of Takelot II and then from Year 22 to Year 39 of Shoshenq III when Osorkon B finally defeated his enemies and conquered this great city. Osorkon B proclaimed himself as king Osorkon III sometime after his victory.

On other matters, the Chronicle of Prince Osorkon B, which is carved on the Bubastis Portal at Karnak, records Osorkon's activities between regnal years 11 and 24 of his father and then from regnal years 22 through 29 of Shoshenq III. However, Takelot II's brief 25th year is attested by a donation stela made by his son in his position as High Priest at Thebes shortly before Takelot died; it granted 35 aurourae of land to Takelot II's daughter, Karomama E. Papyrus Berlin 3048 has also now been conclusively dated to Takelot II's (and not Takelot III's) reign due to the attestation of a certain Harsiese—designated the fourth prophet of Amun—in this document who is known to have served in office during king Takelot II's reign. This papyrus contains several year dates including a year 13, year 14, year 16, year 23 and even a year 26—although a Year 26 date for Takelot II is unknown for this ruler and could pertain to another pharaoh instead. As of 2008, no tomb or final resting place has been found for this king. Takelot II was not succeeded by his eldest son, the High Priest Osorkon B, but by possibly another son, Iuput I. Passing into the allegiance of Shoshenq III, Osorkon B reappeared as high priest at Thebes on several more occasions until Year 39 of Shoshenq III, before finally assuming the kingship as Osorkon III.

== Marriages and children ==
Takelot II married his sister and Great Royal Wife Karomama Merymut II; they were the parents of:

- Osorkon B, the High Priest of Amun at Thebes who later became king Osorkon III.
- Bakenptah B, general of Heracleopolis. Mentioned in a text dating to year 39 of Shoshenq III and said to be a brother of the High Priest Osorkon B.

Takelot II also married a lady whose name was only partially preserved as Tashep[...]. They had a son:

- Nimlot F, mentioned on a wooden stela (Turin 1468/Vatican 329) as the son of King Takelot and Tashep[...]. Thought to be a son of Takelot II.

Takelot also had a wife named Tabektenasket (I), they had a daughter:

- Isetweret (II). Married the Theban Vizier Nakhtefmut (C). Known from the coffins of her son Ankhpakhered and daughter Tabektenasket (II) (Berlin 20132 and 20136).

Other children:

- Djed-Ptah-ef-ankh, a younger son of Takelot II.
- Shebensopdet (II). Married the Fourth Prophet of Amun Djed-Khons-ef-ankh. She is known from a statue now in the Cairo Museum (CG 42211)
- Karomama (E). Chantress of Amun.

Possible further children:

- Iuput I, who appears to have succeeded Takelot II on the throne, preempting the succession of Osorkon III.
- Tentsepeh (D), married Ptah-udj-ankhef. Kitchen assumed she was a daughter of Takelot II. Bierbrier assumed she was a daughter of Osorkon II instead.
- Ir-Bast-udja-tjau, married Pakhuru, the brother of Vizier Padiamonet. She was a daughter of either Takelot II or Takelot III.
- Di-Ese-nesyt, married Nespaqashuty B, the nephew of Vizier Padiamonet. She was a daughter of either Takelot II or Takelot III.
