= Nile Level Texts =

Ancient Egyptian inscriptions dated 943–525 BC

The Nile Level Texts (or Nile Quay Texts) are Ancient Egyptian inscriptions which recorded the annual heights of the Nile. They are dated to the 22nd through the 26th Dynasties, a period spanning four centuries from 943–525 BC. The Nile Level Texts provide valuable historical data as they are dated to specific regnal years. For instance, there are no inscriptions from the period of drought in the early years of Taharqa (r. 690–664 BC). The Nile Level Texts are located on the western side of the cult terrace (sometimes called the "quay") of the Precinct of Amun-Re at the temple of Karnak in Luxor. The terrace structure was built during the reign of Ramesses II (r. 1279–1213 BC).

The texts were first examined and recorded by Georges Legrain in 1896, and later recollated by Jürgen von Beckerath in 1953. Many are now damaged or lost through erosion.

== See also ==
- Flooding of the Nile
- Nilometer
