= Family tree of the Twenty-first, Twenty-second, and Twenty-third Dynasties of Egypt =

Family tree of ancient Egyptian rulers

The Twenty-first, Twenty-second, and Twenty-third Dynasties ruled Egypt from the 10th century through the 8th century BC. The family tree of the Twenty-first dynasty was heavily interconnected with the family of the High Priests of Amun at Thebes. The Twenty-second dynasty and Twenty-third dynasty were also related by marriage to the family of the High Priests.

== Family tree ==
descent
possibly descent
marriage
possibly marriage

- - Pharaoh of 21st Dynasty
- - Pharaoh of 22nd Dynasty
- - Pharaoh of 23rd Dynasty
- - High Priest of Amun

Hrere	Ramesses XI r.1107–1078/77 BC	Tentamun A
Twentieth Dynasty of Egypt
Piankh r.1074–1070 BC	Nodjmet	Herihor r.1080–1074 BC	Queen Tentamun B	Smendes r.1077 - 1051 BC
Pinedjem I r.1070–1032 BC	Queen Duathathor-Henuttawy	Amenemnisu r.1051–1047 BC
Queen Mutnedjmet	Psusennes I r.1047 - 1001 BC	Lady Wiay	Menkheperre r.1045–992 BC	Masaharta r.1054–1045 BC	Djedkhonsuefankh r.1046–1045 BC
Amenemope r.1001 - 992 BC	Isetemkheb C (III)	Shoshenq A Great Chief of the Ma	Mehtenweskhet A King's Mother
Smendes II r.992–990 BC	Pinedjem II r.990–976 BC	Isetemkheb D	Osorkon the Elder r.992 – 986 BC	Nimlot A Great Chief of the Ma	Tentsepeh A
same person?	Twenty-first Dynasty of Egypt
Psusennes III r.976–943? BC	Psusennes II r.967 - 943 BC	Siamun r.986 - 967 BC	Queen Karimala	Shoshenq I r.943–922 BC	Karomama A
Queen Maatkare B	Osorkon I r.922–887 BC	Tashedkhonsu	Iuput r.944–924 BC
same person?
Nesitanebetashru	Shoshenq C	Shoshenq II r.887–885 BC	Iuwelot	Smendes III	Takelot I r.885–872 BC	Queen Kapes
Harsiese A r.880–860 BC	Harsiese B	Djedmutesakh IV	Osorkon II r.872–837 BC
Tentsepeh C	Nimlot C r.855–845 BC	Shoshenq III r.837–798 BC
Pedubast I r.829–804 BC	Queen Karomama II	Takelot II r.845/34 – 835/824 BC (as High Priest of Amun from 845–840 BC)	Shoshenq IV r.798–785 BC
Shoshenq VI r.804–798 BC	Iuput I r.829–804 BC	Osorkon III r.798–769 BC (as High Priest of Amun from 840–785 BC)	Ptahudjankhef; Chief of Herakleopolis	Pami r.785–778 BC
Shoshenq VII r.755–732 BC	Takelot III r.774–759 BC	Rudamun r.759–755 BC	Shoshenq V r.778–740 BC	Tadibast III; King's Wife	Pedubast II r.740–730 BC
Ini r.720 – 715 BC	Peftjauawybast; King of Herakleopolis Magna r.c.754-c.720 BC	Irbastudjanefu	Osorkon F	Osorkon IV r.730–716 BC
Twenty-third Dynasty of Egypt	Male-line ancestors of Pasenhor (see Stela of Pasenhor)	Twenty-second Dynasty of Egypt

== See also ==
- Ancient Egyptian family trees
- Twenty-first dynasty of Egypt
- Twenty-second Dynasty of Egypt
- Twenty-third Dynasty of Egypt
