= Shoshenq =

Shoshenq (also commonly spelled Sheshonq, Sheshonk, Shoshenk, Shashank) was the name of many Ancient Egyptians with Libu ancestry since the Third Intermediate Period.

== People named Shoshenq ==
Several pharaohs with this name are known, as well as many important state officials:

=== Pharaohs ===
- Shoshenq I (Hedjkheperre), founder of the 22nd Dynasty, often identified as the Shishaq of the Hebrew Bible
- Shoshenq II (Heqakheperre), of the 22nd Dynasty
- Shoshenq IIb (Tutkheperre), of the 22nd Dynasty
- Shoshenq IIc (Maatkheperre), of the 22nd Dynasty
- Shoshenq III (Usermaatre Setepenre), of the 22nd Dynasty
- Shoshenq IV (Hedjkheperre), of the 22nd Dynasty
- Shoshenq V (Aakheperre), of the 22nd Dynasty
- Shoshenq VI (Usermaatre Meryamun), of the 23rd Dynasty
- Shoshenq VII (Hedjkheperre), doubted existence.

=== Officials ===
- Shoshenq A, grandfather of Shoshenq I
- Shoshenq C, a Theban High Priest of Amun, son of pharaoh Osorkon I
- Shoshenq D, a High Priest of Ptah, son of pharaoh Osorkon II
- Shoshenq, Chief steward of the God's Wife of Amun Ankhnesneferibre, buried in TT27

== Renderings of Shoshenq in English ==
SA SA n q
Shoshenq
ššnq
in hieroglyphs
Era: 3rd Intermediate Period
(1069–664 BC)

Because vowels are not generally written in the ancient Egyptian language, the exact pronunciation of this name has caused some amount of controversy, and it is common to see both Shoshenq and Sheshonq used in English-language publications. There is, however, some evidence indicating that Shoshenq is preferable.

The name "Shoshenq" originates in an ancient Libyco-Berber language, perhaps related to the Numidian Berber language used during the time of the Roman Empire. Unfortunately, unlike some other Libyan rulers of Ancient Egypt, there is no name in the corpus of Old Libyco-Berber text that might be an equivalent to the Egyptian rendering of the name.

Egyptologists conventionally transliterate the name in hieroglyphs as ššnq. In ancient Egyptian texts, writings without the [n] and/or (less commonly) the [q] are not uncommon. For example, the name is recorded in the Neo-Assyrian dialect of Akkadian as šusanqu and susinqu, indicating an initial rounded vowel. It is generally considered that the evidence suggests rendering it as "Sheshonq" should be avoided, in favour of "Shoshenq".

The writings of Manetho, as recorded by the Byzantine historians Sextus Julius Africanus, Eusebius of Caesarea, and George Syncellus use two general forms (with variations depending on the manuscript). Africanus spells the name Σεσωγχις [Sesōnkhis], while Eusebius (as quoted by George Syncellus) uses Σεσογχωσις [Sesonkhōsis]. The alteration in the vowels [o] and [e] is probably due to metathesis.

== Sources ==
- Aidan Dodson (1995). “Rise & Fall of The House of Shoshenq: The Libyan Centuries of Egyptian History.” KMT: A Modern Journal of Ancient Egypt 6 (3):52–67.
- Troy Leiland Sagrillo. 2015. "Shoshenq I and biblical Šîšaq: A philological defense of their traditional equation." In Solomon and Shishak: Current perspectives from archaeology, epigraphy, history and chronology; proceedings of the third BICANE colloquium held at Sidney Sussex College, Cambridge 26–27 March 2011, edited by Peter J. James, Peter G. van der Veen, and Robert M. Porter. British Archaeological Reports (International Series) 2732. Oxford: Archaeopress. 61–81.
- Jürgen von Beckerath (1997). Chronologie des Pharaonischen Ägypten, Mainz: Philip Von Zabern.
