= Maatkare =

N5 C10 D28
maatkaree
in hieroglyphs

Maatkare is a name shared by several royal women from Ancient Egypt:

- Maatkare Hatshepsut, the throne name of Queen/Pharaoh Hatshepsut (Eighteenth dynasty of Egypt)
- Maatkare Mutemhat, King's Daughter of his body, Adoratrix, God's Wife of Amun. Daughter of High Priest of Amun Pinedjem I and Duathathor-Henuttawy. (Twenty-first dynasty of Egypt)
- Maatkare B, King's Daughter, Priestess of Hathor. Daughter of Psusennes II, wife of Osorkon I and mother of Shoshenq II. (Twenty-second dynasty of Egypt)
