= Psusennes =

G40 N14 N28 N35 O49
Pasebakhaenniut
in hieroglyphs
Era: 3rd Intermediate Period
(1069–664 BC)

Psusennes is the Greek form of the ancient Egyptian name Pasebakhaenniut (p3-sb3-ḫˁỉ-n-nỉwt, "The star appearing in the city (=Thebes)". There are three major figures of that name:

Two 21st Dynasty pharaohs:

- Psusennes I
- Psusennes II

and a 21st dynasty High Priest of Amun, who may be the same person as Psusennes II:

- Psusennes III
