= Tutkheperre Shoshenq =

Ancient Egyptian pharaoh

Shoshenq IIb
- Sheshonq

Pharaoh
- Reign: uncertain
- Predecessor: Unknown
- Successor: Unknown
Royal titulary
Prenomen
Tutkheperre Setpenre/amun
twt-ḫpr-rʿ stp/mr-n-rʿ/jmn/ptḥ
The very image of the manifestation of Ra, Chosen by Ra/Amun/Ptah

M23 X1 L2 X1	N5 t w t L1 HASH
Nomen
Shoshenq Meryamun
ššnq mrj-jmn
Shoshenq, Beloved of Amun

G39 N5	M17 Y5 N35 N36 M8 M8 N35 N29
- Dynasty: 22nd Dynasty

Tutkheperre Shoshenq (Egyptian: twt-ḫpr-rʿ stp/mr-n-rʿ/jmn/ptḥ ššnq mrj-jmn), arbitrarily designated Shoshenq IIb, is an obscure Third Intermediate Period ancient Egyptian pharaoh whose existence was only recently confirmed, based on attestations from Abydos and Bubastis.

== Evidence and interpretation ==
This king's name was first attested on Ostracon Louvre E 31886 discovered by Émile Amélineau in his 1897–1898 excavations at Abydos in Upper Egypt. This ostracon was found amid New Kingdom and later votive deposits around the "Tomb of Osiris" and is now in the Louvre Museum. While Amélineau read the royal name as Tutkheperre [...]amun [...]-meryamun and noted it as previously unknown, in 1995 Marie-Ange Bonhême revealed that the king's birth name (nomen) on the ostracon was read as Shoshenq-meryamun by Jean Yoyotte. On this basis, Bonhême concluded that this was a new king belonging sometime in the 22nd Dynasty. Subsequently, in 2004, Eva Lange published additional evidence for the existence of King Tutkheperre Shoshenq, based on the attestation of his names on a stone block from the Temple of Bastet at Bubastis. Lange compared the new attestation to that discovered by Amélineau and interpreted by Yoyotte and Bonhême and restored the throne name as Tutkheperre-setepenamun, while noting an additional fragmentary royal name from Bubastis with the variant [Tut]kheperre-setepenre Shoshenq-[meryamun]. In a subsequent study, Frédéric Payraudeau read the throne name on the Louvre ostracon as Tutkheperre-setepenptah or Tutkheperre-merenptah, but agreed that this is indeed an attestation of a King Tutkheperre Shoshenq. The reconstruction of the epithet attached to the throne name (prenomen) thus remains disputed among scholars, but could have varied in different inscriptions.

The relatively original throne name of Tutkheperre Shoshenq suggested to Lange and Karl Jansen-Winkeln that he probably reigned early in the 22nd Dynasty. Jansen-Winkeln restated the case for viewing Tutkheperre Shoshenq as a king of the early 22nd Dynasty, ruling the entire country, since he was attested in both the north and the south, and tentatively placed his reign between those of Sekhemkheperre Osorkon I and Hedjkheperre Takelot I, just like the similarly tentative placement of another obscure king, Heqakheperre Shoshenq IIa. David Aston and Thomas Schneider considered Heqakheperre Shoshenq IIa, Tutkheperre Shoshenq IIb, and Maatkheperre Shoshenq IIc attractive candidates for the three kings mentioned as intervening between Osorkon I and Takelot I for upward of two decades in the epitome of Manetho by Sextus Julius Africanus. Gerard Broekman had reservations on this approach, doubting the existence Maatkheperre and believing Heqakheperre and Tutkheperre to have reigned for a very short time. Payraudeau considered that Tutkheperre Shoshenq could not have been a son of Hedjkheperre Shoshenq I, Sekhemkheperre Osorkon I, or Usermaatre Osorkon II-sibaste, because the succession of Osorkon I to Shoshenq I was immediate, Osorkon I already had a son Shoshenq Q who failed to become a king, and there was no room for an additional king Shoshenq in the period of divided kingship following Osorkon II's reign. Instead, Frédéric Payraudeau proposed that Tutkheperre Shoshenq could have been a son and ephemeral successor of King Akheperre Osorkon in the 21st Dynasty. In a more recent work, Frederic Payraudeau envisaged Tutkheperre Shoshenq IIb as a king between Takelot I and Osorkon II, placing him as a predecessor of Heqakheperre Shoshenq IIa, whom he tentatively identified as a son of Takelot I and brother and predecessor of Osorkon II.

In addition to scholars who sought to place Tutkheperre Shoshenq as a discrete individual at some point in the line of kings, other scholars have considered whether this royal name was not an alternative name of a king better known by a different name. Thus, Aidan Dodson proposed that Tutkheperre was the original throne name (prenomen) of Hedjkheperre Shoshenq I, used sometime before the first documented attestation of the familiar throne name in his Year 5 and supported by the circumstantial evidence of attestations at Abydos, also associated with his predecessor Tytkheperre Psusennes II. Similarly, Kenneth Kitchen suggested Shoshenq I went through three throne names, starting as Maatkheperre, changing it to Tutkheperre, and finally settling on Hedjkheperre by Year 5. Andrzej Niwiński proposed that Hedjkheperre Shoshenq I varied his royal names over time and in different places, and that the throne names Heqakheperre, Tutkheperre, and Maatkheperre all applied to him.

Depending on the historical scenario and identity of Tutkheperre Shoshenq—son of Osorkon the Elder, an early name of Shoshenq I, or a king reigning between Osorkon I and Osorkon II—his reign would fall either in the mid-10th century BC or in the early 9th century BC.
