= Maatkheperre Shoshenq =

Egyptian pharaoh of the 22nd dynasty

Shoshenq IIc
- Sheshonq
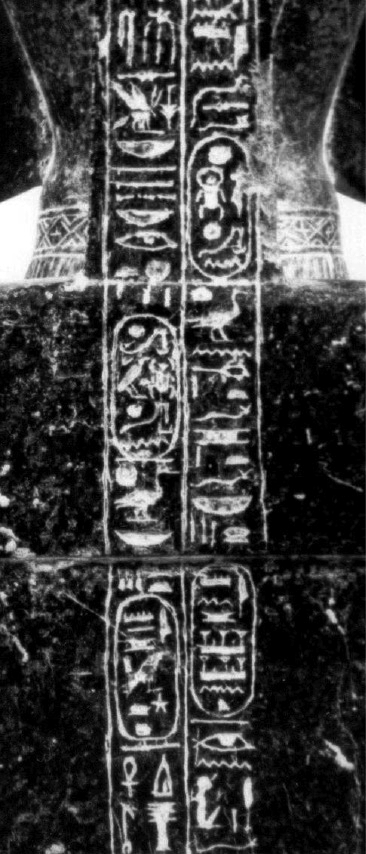

Pharaoh
- Predecessor: uncertain
- Successor: uncertain
Royal titulary
Horus name
unknown
Nebty name
unknown
Golden Horus
unknown
Prenomen
Maatkheperre Setepenre
M3ˁt-ḫpr-Rˁ-stp-n-Rʿ
The true one is a manifestation of Ra, Chosen by Ra
M23 t L2 t < N5 H6 L1 U21 N5 N35 >
Nomen
Shoshenq Meryamun
Ššnq-mrj-Jmn
Shoshenq, Beloved of Amun
G39 N5 < M17 Y5 N35 N36 M8 M8 N35 N29 >
- Died: 9th century BC
- Dynasty: 22nd Dynasty

Maatkheperre-setepenre Shoshenq-meryamun (Egyptian mȝʿt-ḫpr-rʿ stp-n-rʿ ššnq mrj-jmn, or mȝʿ-ḫpr-rʿ, etc.), arbitrarily designated Shoshenq IIc, is an obscure pharaoh of the 22nd Dynasty. Because so far he is documented in a single published inscription, on the back of a reinscribed statue of Thutmose III, CG 42192, his historicity has been doubted. Additional but yet unpublished attestations appear to have been uncovered at Abydos. The precise identity, chronological and genealogical position of Maatkheperre Shoshenq remains uncertain.

== Evidence and interpretation ==
The sole published attestation of Maatkheperre-setepenre Shoshenq-meryamun to date has been an inscription on the dorsal pillar of a seated statue originally representing Thutmose III, now item CG 42192 in the Egyptian Museum in Cairo. This text was inscribed or reinscribed on the orders of King Maatkheperre Shoshenq to commemorate ("renew the name") of his progenitor ("he who begot him"), King Tytkheperre Psusennes II of the 21st Dynasty. Apart from placing Maatkheperre Shoshenq at some point in time after Psusennes II and indicating that this Shoshenq considered himself in some sense the progeny of this Psusennes, the text provides no historical information. Egyptologists have been divided between either explaining away the seemingly unique reference to a king Maatkheperre Shoshenq as an erroneous writing of another king’s names or finding a place for the person and reign of a king bearing these names as a distinct monarch.

The mȝʿt feather of the royal name Maatkheperre has been considered a possible mistake for the remotely similar shapes of the ḥḏ crown of the royal name Hedjkheperre or of the ḥqȝ crook of the royal name Heqakheperre, which would identify Maatkheperre Shoshenq as a miswritten attestation of either Hedjkheperre Shoshenq I or Heqakhaperre Shoshenq IIa. However, there now appear to be yet unpublished additional attestations from the excavations at Umm el-Qaʿāb in Abydos, which would militate against viewing the throne name Maatkheperre as a misspelling.

Gerard Broekman, taking the reference to Maatkheperre Shoshenq being begotten by Tytkheperre Psusennes literally, has argued that therefore Maatkheperre Shoshenq IIc was a son and ephemeral successor of Psusennes II. Andrzej Niwiński proposed that Hedjkheperre Shoshenq I varied his royal names over time and in different places, and that the throne names Heqakheperre, Tutkheperre, and Maatkheperre all applied to him. Kenneth Kitchen proposed that Maatkheperre was the original throne name of Shoshenq I, who would have changed it to Tutkheperre and then finally settled on Hedjkheperre. Jürgen von Beckerath initially considered Maatkheperre Shoshenq a miswriting of the royal name Heqakheperre Shoshenq, then tentatively identified Maatkheperre Shoshenq as the royal name of the former High Priest of Amun Shoshenq Q, the son of Sekhemkheperre Osorkon I by Maatkare B, the daughter of Psusennes II, thus making Maatkheperre Shoshenq a more distant but still direct descendant of Psusennes II. Karl Jansen-Winkeln and José Lull also identified Maatkheperre Shoshenq as the former High Priest of Amun Shoshenq Q. The problem with identifying the High Priest Shoshenq Q as any one of the kings Heqakheperre Shoshenq IIa, Tutkheperre Shoshenq IIb, and Maatkheperre Shoshenq IIc is that no contemporary or later text, including texts written for the high priest’s descendants, knows him as king.

The chronological placement of the reign of Maatkheperre Shoshenq varies from hypothesis to hypothesis, depending on the identity attributed to him by a particular scholar. The range of the placements would be roughly from the mid-940s BC (if a son of Psusennes II) to the 870s or 860s BC. For at least some of those who identify him with the High Priest of Amun Shoshenq Q, Maatkheperre Shoshenq would not have had an independent reign, perhaps dying before his father Osorkon I in the early 880s BC.

== Bibliography ==
- Aston, David 2009, "Takeloth II, A King of the Herakleopolitan/Theban Twenty-Third Dynasty Revisited," in: G. P. F. Broekman, R. J. Demarée and O. E. Kaper (eds.), The Libyan Period in Egypt: Historical and Cultural Studies into the 21st–24th Dynasties, Leiden: 1-28.
- Beckerath, Jürgen von 1994, "Zur Rückeninschrift der Statuette Kairo CG 42192," Orientalia 63: 84-87. online
- Beckerath, Jürgen von 1995, "Beiträge zur Geschichte der Libyerzeit," Göttinger Miszellen 144: 7-13.
- Bonhême, Marie-Ange 1987, Les noms royaux dans l’Égypte de la troisième période intermédiaire, Cairo.
- Broekman, Gerard P. F. 2000, "Shoshenq Maäkheperre and Shoshenq Heqakheperre," Göttinger Miszellen 176: 39-46.
- Broekman, Gerard P. F. 2012/2013, "Manetho's 'Three other kings' between Osorthôn and Takelôthis and their importance for the chronology of the Third Intermediate Period and the New Kingdom PDF," Ägypten und Levante 22/23: 349-351.
- Broekman, Gerard P. F. 2018, "On the identity of King Shoshenq Heqakheperre, buried in royal tomb NRT III in Tanis: a reconsideration," Göttinger Miszellen 254: 25-36.
- Dodson, Aidan 2009, "The Transition between the 21st and 22nd Dynasties revisited," in: G. P. F. Broekman, R. J. Demarée and O. E. Kaper (eds.), The Libyan Period in Egypt: Historical and Cultural Studies into the 21st–24th Dynasties, Leiden: 103-112. online
- Dodson, Aidan 2012, Afterglow of Empire: Egypt from the Fall of the New Kingdom to the Saite Renaissance, Cairo.
- Effland, Ute, and Andreas Effland 2018, "Umm el-Qaab (Abydos), Ägypten. Untersuchungen zum Osiriskult in Abydos vom Alten Reich bis in die Spätzeit. Die Arbeiten der Jahre 2017 und 2018," e-Forschungerichte des DAI 2: 47-51. online
- Gauthier, Henri 1914, Le livre des rois d'Égypte, vol. 3. Institut français d’archéologie orientale: Cairo. online
- Hornung, Erik, Rolf Krauss, and David Warburton (eds.) 2006, Ancient Egyptian Chronology, Leiden: Brill.
- Jacquet-Gordon, Helen 1975, "Review of K. A. Kitchen, The Third Intermediate Period in Egypt," Bibliotheca Orientalis 32: 358-360. online
- Jansen-Winkeln, Karl 1995, "Historische Probleme der 3. Zwischenzeit," Journal of Egyptian Archaeology 81: 129-149. online
- Jansen-Winkeln, Karl 2007, Inschriften der Spätzeit. Teil II: Die 22.–24. Dynastie, Wiesbaden: Harrassowitz.
- Kaper, Olaf E. 2008, "The Libyan Period in Egypt," Egyptian Archaeology 32: 38-39.
- Kitchen, Kenneth A. 1995: The Third Intermediate Period in Egypt (1100–650 BC), 3rd ed., Warminster: Aris & Phillips.
- Kitchen, Kenneth A. 2009: "The Third Intermediate Period in Egypt: An Overview of Fact & Fiction," in: G. P. F. Broekman, R. J. Demarée and O. E. Kaper (eds.), The Libyan Period in Egypt: Historical and Cultural Studies into the 21st–24th Dynasties, Leiden: 161-202.
- Leprohon, Ronald J. 2013, The Great Name: Ancient Egyptian Royal Titulary, Society of Biblical Literature: Atlanta.
- Lull, José 2006, "Psusennes, primer sacerdote de Amón, y Psusennes II, rey de Egipto, genealogía, documentación y problemas," Aula Orientalis 24: 57-77. online
- Niwiński, Andrzej 2013, "Multiplicity of Shoshenqs in the Early Twenty-second Dynasty: A Good Reason to Apply Ockham’s Razor Principle," Études et travaux, Institut des cultures méditerranéennes et orientales de l'Académie polonaise des sciences 26: 488-499. online
- Payraudeau, Frédéric 2014, Administration, société et pouvoir à Thèbes sous la XXIIe dynastie bubastide, Cairo: Institut français d'archéologie orientale.
- Payraudeau, Frédéric 2020, L'Égypte et la vallée du Nil Tome 3: Les époques tardives (1069–332 av. J.-C.), Paris: Presses universitaires de France.
- Römer, Malte 1990, "Varia zu Psusennes "II." und zur 21. Dynastie," Göttinger Miszellen 114: 93-99.
