= Shoshenq Q =

Egyptian High Priest of Amun

Shoshenq
- High Priest of Amun in Thebes
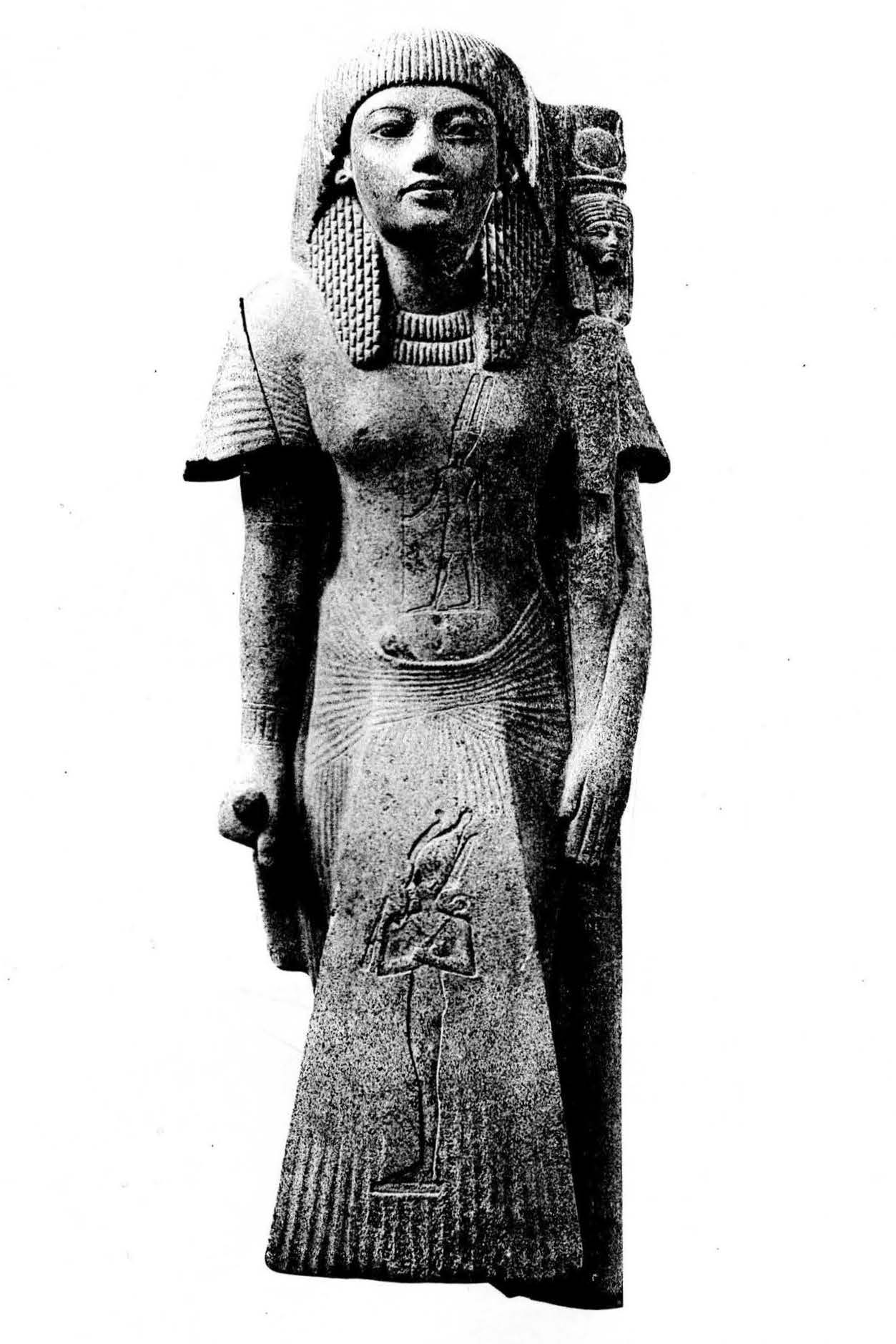
- Statue of the High priest of Amun Shoshenq, son of Osorkon I, from Karnak. Cairo, CG 42194
- Predecessor: Iuput
- Successor: Iuwelot
- Dynasty: 22nd Dynasty
- Pharaoh: Osorkon I
- Spouse: Nesitanebetasheru; Nesitawedjatre; Tadenitenbastet; Isetemkhebyt called Ikhy
- Father: Osorkon I
- Mother: Maatkare B
- Children: Harsiese A Osorkon D Khaemwast; Karomama G

Shoshenq or Shoshenq-meryamun (Egyptian ššnq mrj-jmn), designated Shoshenq Q, was the son of the 22nd Dynasty pharaoh Sekhemkheperre Osorkon I and Maatkare B, and served as the High Priest of Amun at Thebes during his father's reign. He is often considered a candidate for identification with one of another of several obscure kings named Shoshenq who reigned in this general period.

== Career ==
Shoshenq Q's mother, the princess Maatkare B, represented a demonstrable link between the royal families of her father, Psusennes II of the 21st Dynasty, and of her husband's father, Shoshenq I of the 22nd Dynasty, but she apparently died before her husband became king and does not appear with any queenly titles. Based on his name (honoring his grandfather, King Shoshenq I) and the royal origins of his mother, Shoshenq Q has been considered the eldest and most prominent of the sons of King Osorkon I. Yet he does not seem to bear the title of "Eldest King's Son" in any inscription.

As the High Priest of Amun at Thebes, Shoshenq was the most important official in Upper Egypt after the king himself, although he does not seem to have matched the prominence his uncle Iuput A had enjoyed in the same position during the reign of Shoshenq's grandfather Shoshenq I. Presumably following the death of Iuput early in the reign of his brother, King Osorkon I, the latter appointed his own son Shoshenq High Priest of Amun to perpetuate royal influence at Thebes and more generally Upper Egypt. Shoshenq presided over a priestly induction, inscribed a graffito in the Luxor Temple, and dedicated four statues at Karnak, including the Nile-God (Inundation) Statue EA8 now in the British Museum. He also dedicated a statue to the god Bes (now in the Durham Museum) on behalf of his son, the Prophet of Amun Harsiese A. The High Priest Shoshenq is also named on ostraca from Abydos. He was evidently succeeded in office by Iuwelot, who was another son of Osorkon I. Shoshenq's son, Harsiese A, later ruled over Thebes and Middle Egypt as king.

Numerous assumptions center on the notion that Shoshenq Q became king as co-regent of his father or as his short-lived successor. A primary advocate of such a scenario, with Shoshenq as his father's non-surviving co-regent, was the influential Egyptologist Kenneth Kitchen, who identified the High Priest Shoshenq Q with the obscure King Heqakheperre Shoshenq, whose undisturbed burial was excavated by Pierre Montet at Tanis, who himself originated the idea for such an identification. Andrzej Niwiński, who interpreted all the unidentified throne names of a king named Shoshenq (Heqakheperre, Tutkheperre, and Maatkheperre as variant throne names of Shoshenq I, still considers that "the only candidate for the position 'Shoshenq II' remains the son of Osorkon, High Priest of Amun, whose name occasionally appears in a cartouche." Jürgen von Beckerath, Norbert Dautzenberg, Karl Jansen-Winkeln, and José Lull came to the conclusion that Shoshenq Q must have become king as Maatkheperre Shoshenq, rather than as Heqakheperre Shoshenq.

However, it is not at all clear that Shoshenq Q ever became king as either co-ruler or successor of his father. Some aspiration toward kingly status is suggested by Statue EA8 in the British Museum, where Shoshenq's name, paired with the royal epithet "beloved by Amun" (mrj-jmn), is enclosed in a royal cartouche and he is titled, in two instances, "Lord of the Two Lands" in the text. Nevertheless, the same monument consistently titles Shoshenq Q the "First Prophet of Amun-Re, King of the Gods, Shoshenq-meryamun," also "leader" (ḥȝw.ty), once specifying that he is "at the head of all the great armies of Egypt," and names him as the "King's Son of the Lord of the Two Lands, Lord of Appearances, Osorkon-meryamun, whose mother is Maatkare, King's Daughter of the Lord of the Two Lands, Hor-Psusennes-meryamun." The monument does not title Shoshenq king, nor provides him with a throne name (prenomen), and he is depicted as mere High Priest of Amun without kingly attributes by the leg of the Nile (Inundation) God. Although very rare, the use of a cartouche by a king's son is attested in other periods of Egyptian history, for example for Siamun A, the son of Nebpehtire Ahmose, and for Amenmose, the son of Thutmose I, in the Eighteenth Dynasty.

The available evidence rather suggests that Shoshenq Q never became king. None of his three known wives is titled "King's Wife," and none of his children or more distant descendants ever title him king in their inscriptions, for example in the funerary accoutrements of Shoshenq's son Osorkon D (including a funerary papyrus at the St. Petersburg Museum of History) and grandson Iuput B. Similarly, the God's Wife of Amun Karomama G, thought to be Shoshenq's daughter, is not titled "King's Daughter."

== Family ==
Shoshenq Q married the following women and had the following children and grandchildren:

- (m.) Nesitanebetasheru B, mother of
  - Harsiese A, Prophet of Amun, never High Priest but later King Hedjkheperre Harsiese, father of
    - [Pe]du[bast], possibly the later King Pedubast I
    - Isetweret i, who married the 2nd Prophet of Amun Harsiese C
    - Tadittanebethen
- (m.) Nesitawedjatre, mother of
  - Osorkon D, Prophet of Amun, father of
    - Iuput B, Prophet of Amun
- (m.) Tadenitenbastet, Daughter of the King's Son (the High Priest Iuput A?), who later married the High Priest Iuwelot, mother of
  - Khaemwast, adoptive son of his stepfather Iuwelot
- (m.) Isetemkhebyt, called Ikhy, who later married the High Priest Smendes III
- (m.) unknown (possibly one of the above wives), mother of
  - Karomama G, God's Wife of Amun

== Bibliography ==
- Beckerath, Jürgen von 1994, "Zur Rückeninschrift der Statuette Kairo CG 42192," Orientalia 63: 84-87. online
- Dautzenberg, Norbert 1995, "Bemerkungen zu Shoshenq II., Takeloth II. und Pedubastis II.," Göttinger Miszellen 144: 21-29.
- Dodson, Aidan 1990, "Crown Prince Djhutmose and the Royal Sons of the Eighteenth Dynasty," Journal of Egyptian Archaeology 76: 87-96.
- Dodson, Aidan, and Dyan Hilton 2004, The Complete Royal Families of Ancient Egypt, London: Thames & Hudson.
- Dodson, Aidan 2012, Afterglow of Empire: Egypt from the Fall of the New Kingdom to the Saite Renaissance, Cairo: American University in Cairo Press.
- Edwards, I. E. S. 1982, "Egypt: From the Twenty Second to the Twenty Fourth Dynasty," in: John Boardman et al. (eds.), The Cambridge Ancient History 3/1: The Prehistory of the Balkans’ and the Middle East and the Aegean world, tenth to eighth centuries B.C., Cambridge: 534-581.
- Hornung, Erik, Rolf Krauss, and David Warburton (eds.) 2006, Ancient Egyptian Chronology, Leiden: Brill.
- Jacquet-Gordon, Helen 1975, "Review of K. A. Kitchen, The Third Intermediate Period in Egypt," Bibliotheca Orientalis 32: 358-360. online
- Jansen-Winkeln, Karl 1995, "Historische Probleme der 3. Zwischenzeit," Journal of Egyptian Archaeology 81: 129-149. online
- Jansen-Winkeln, Karl 2007, Inschriften der Spätzeit. Teil II: Die 22.–24. Dynastie, Wiesbaden: Harrassowitz.
- Kitchen, Kenneth A. 1995: The Third Intermediate Period in Egypt (1100–650 BC), 3rd ed., Warminster: Aris & Phillips.
- Leprohon, Ronald J. 2013, The Great Name: Ancient Egyptian Royal Titulary, Society of Biblical Literature: Atlanta.
- Montet, Pierre 1947, La nécropole royale de Tanis 1: Les constructions et le tombeau d'Osorkon II à Tanis, Paris.
- Montet, Pierre 1951, La nécropole royale de Tanis 2: Les constructions et le tombeau de Psousennès I à Tanis, Paris.
- Niwiński, Andrzej 2013, "Multiplicity of Shoshenqs in the Early Twenty-second Dynasty: A Good Reason to Apply Ockham’s Razor Principle," Études et travaux, Institut des cultures méditerranéennes et orientales de l’Académie polonaise des sciences 26: 488-499. online
- Payraudeau, Frédéric 2014, Administration, société et pouvoir à Thèbes sous la XXIIe dynastie bubastide, Cairo: Institut français d'archéologie orientale.
- Payraudeau, Frédéric 2020, L'Égypte et la vallée du Nil Tome 3: Les époques tardives (1069–332 av. J.-C.), Paris: Presses universitaires de France.
- Payraudeau, Frédéric 2022, "Les affaires de famille des grands prêtres d'Amon Chéchonq, Youwelot et Smendès. À propos du scarabée Louvre E 3369," in: Raphaële Meffre and Frédéric Payraudeau (eds.) 2022, Éclats du crepuscule: Recueil d'études sur l'Égypte tardive offert à Olivier Perdu, Leuven: Peeters.
- Ritner, Robert K. 2009, The Libyan Anarchy: Inscriptions from Egypt's Third Intermediate Period, Atlanta: Society of Biblical Literature.
