= Makere =

Makere may refer to:

- Makere, Kenya, a settlement in Coast Province, Kenya
- Makere people, an ethnic group of the Democratic Republic of Congo
- Makere Stewart-Harawira, New Zealand academic

== See also ==
- Makerere, a neighborhood in Kampala, Uganda
- Maatkare, a name shared by several royal women from Ancient Egypt
