= Psusennes III =

Egyptian high priest of Amun

- High Priest of Amun
- Tenure: 976–943? BC
- Predecessor: Pinedjem II
- Successor: Iuput

Psusennes III was the High Priest of Amun at Thebes (976 – 943 BC) at the end of the 21st Dynasty. Little is known of this individual; he is thought by some to be the same person as pharaoh Psusennes II. His name appears on a document found at the 'mummy cache' DB320, which describes him as a son of the High Priest Pinedjem II. This makes him a possible candidate for Psusennes II because Pinedjem II died in Year 10 of Siamun, who was the immediate predecessor of this pharaoh.
