= Shoshenq II =

Egyptian pharaoh

Shoshenq IIa
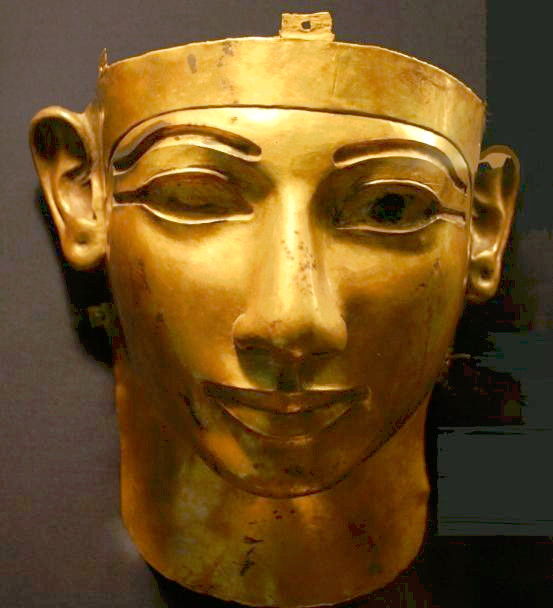
- Gold funerary mask of Heqakheperre Shoshenq in the Cairo Museum

Pharaoh
- Reign: uncertain, possibly c. 873 BC (if not identical to Shoshenq I)
- Predecessor: uncertain, possibly Takelot I
- Successor: uncertain, possibly Osorkon II
Royal titulary
Prenomen
Heqakheperre Setepenre
ḥq3-ḫpr-Rˁ-stp-n-Rˁ
The ruler is the (very) manifestation of Ra, Chosen of Ra

M23 X1 L2 X1	N5 S38 L1 N5 U21 n
Nomen
Shoshenq Meryamun
ššnq mrj-jmn
Shoshenq, Beloved of Amun

G39 N5	M17 Y5 N35 N36 M8 M8 N35 N29
- Died: uncertain, possibly c. 873 BC
- Burial: original place unknown, reburied in NRT III, Tanis
- Dynasty: 22nd Dynasty

The designation Shoshenq II is variously associated by scholars with several different Egyptian royal names, most commonly Heqakheperre Shoshenq IIa, discussed below, but also Tutkheperre Shoshenq IIb and Maatkheperre Shoshenq IIc, and is sometimes applied to the High Priest of Amun Shoshenq Q.

Heqakheperre-setepenre Shoshenq-meryamun (Egyptian ḥqȝ-ḫpr-rʿ stp-n-rʿ ššnq mrj-jmn), arbitrarily designated Shoshenq IIa, was a pharaoh of the 22nd Dynasty. King Heqakheperre Shoshenq is known entirely from his funerary effects, discovered in his reburial at Tanis by Pierre Montet in 1939. Scholars disagree as to the identity and chronological placement of the king.

The royal throne name or prenomen, Heqakheperre Setepenre, has been interpreted as "The manifestation of Ra rules, the chosen one of Ra," or as "The ruler is the (very) manifestation of Ra, the chosen one of Ra."

== Evidence from burial ==
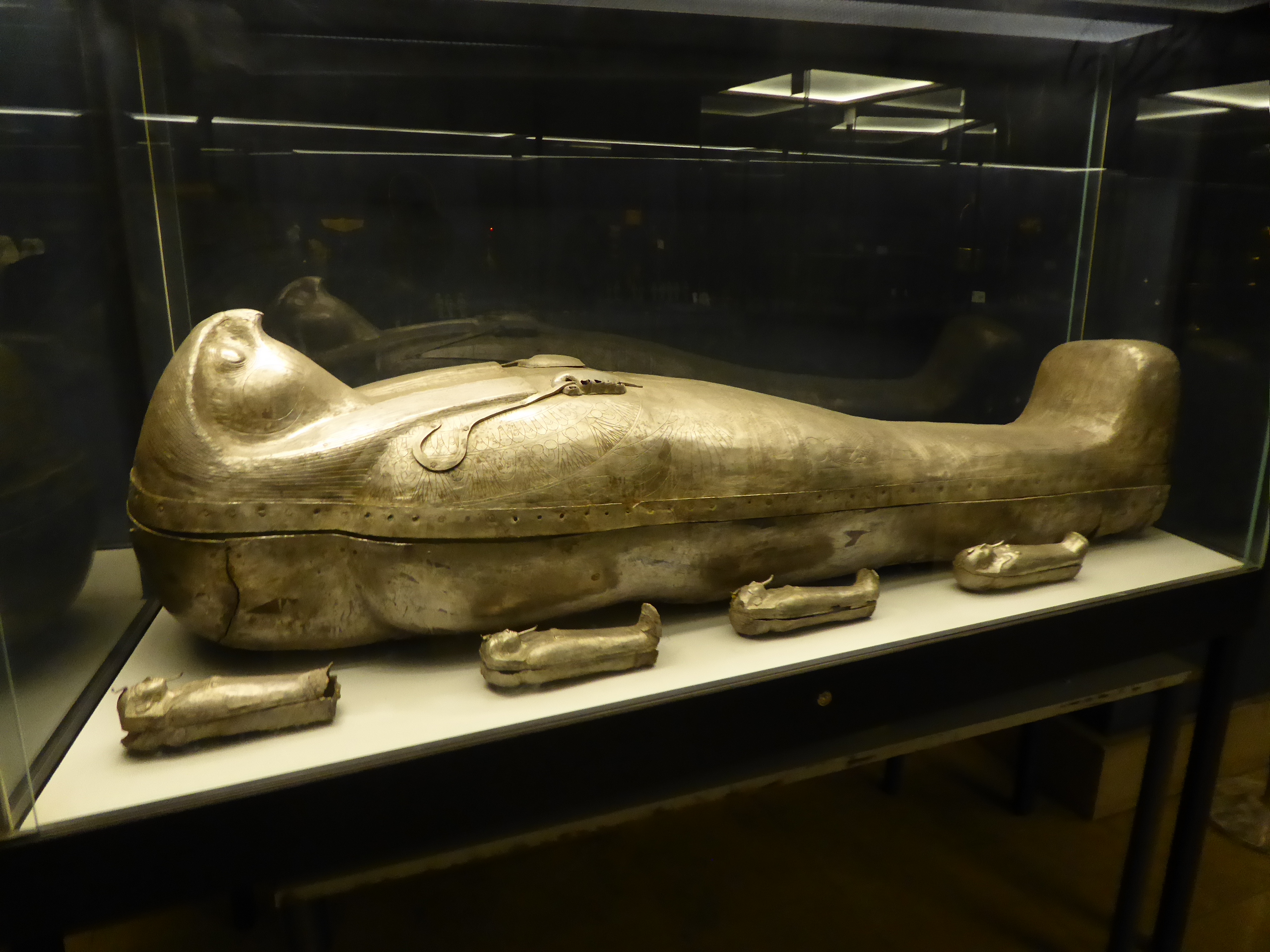
The silver coffin of Heqakheperre Shoshenq from NRT III

The only ruler of this dynasty whose burial was not plundered by tomb robbers, Heqakheperre Shoshenq's final resting place was discovered by Pierre Montet within an antechamber of Psusennes I's tomb at Tanis (NRT III). Montet removed the coffin lid on March 20, 1939, in the presence of King Farouk I himself. The burial proved to contain a beautiful falcon-headed silver coffin, a gold funerary mask, placed over the head of the king, and many jewel-encrusted bracelets and pectorals. Since Heqakheperre Shoshenq is only attested on items from his burial, the inscribed objects found in it have been crucial for scholarly hypotheses regarding his identity and chronological placement.

The inscribed objects from the burial of Heqakheperre Shoshenq included:

- The silver falcon-headed coffin, inscribed with the royal name Heqakheperre Shoshenq (M211)
- The cartonnage inside the coffin, inscribed with the royal name Heqakheperre Shoshenq (M213)
- The pectoral with heart scarab inscribed with the throne name Heqakheperre-setepenre on the gold pectoral plaque and with the birth name Shoshenq-meryamun on the scarab itself (M218)
- A model headrest made of iron inscribed with the royal name Heqakheperre Shoshenq (M243)
- A leather belt with inlaid gold decoration bearing the royal birth name Shoshenq-meryamun without the distinctive throne name (M236)
- Four silver coffinettes bearing the royal birth name Shoshenq-meryamun without the distinctive throne name (M302, M305, M312, M317)
- A pair of gold bracelets inlaid with lapis lazuli, carnelian and white faience, inscribed with the royal name Hedjkheperre Shoshenq I and placed on the wrists of the deceased (M226-227)
- A gold pectoral inlaid with lapis lazuli and glass paste with the solar barque and the goddesses Isis and Maat, inscribed for the Great Chief of Ma Shoshenq, son of the Great Chief of Ma Nimlot, in other words, Hedjkheperre Shoshenq I before his accession to the throne (M219)
- A gold pectoral inlaid with lapis lazuli and colored semi-precious stones with symbolic spelling (cryptogram) of the royal name Hedjkheperre made up of crowned uraei, a scarab, and the solar disk (M220)
- A gold bracelet with a scarab naming a certain Djedptahiufankh, possibly the like-named son of Hedjkheperre Shoshenq I (M228)
- A gold ring naming a certain Haremineb, otherwise unknown (M234)
- A gold bracelet with a scarab naming Menkheperre-who-tramples-the-Asiatics, a reference to the throne name of Thutmose III (M229)

== Interpretation of the evidence ==
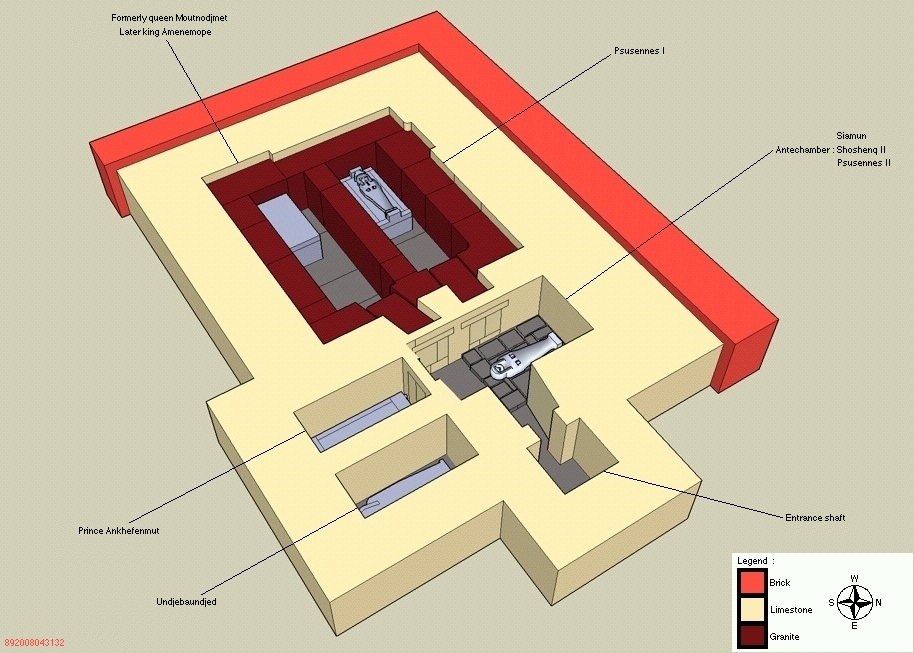
View of tomb NRT III showing where Heqakheperre Shoshenq was buried and discovered

Heqakheperre Shoshenq's remains were examined by Douglas Derry in 1939. He discovered that the mummified body had been reduced to a skeleton, the tissues of the body and the wrappings having been destroyed by water damage, turning into a thick brown deposit. The investigation of the skeletal remains revealed that the king was about 169 cm tall and that he was likely over fifty years of age when he died, apparently as a result of a major septic infection from a head wound, perhaps turning into meningitis. The generous use of silver for the creation of Heqakheperre Shoshenq's coffin is considered a potent symbol of his power because silver "was considerably rarer in Egypt than gold."

Various factors point to the final resting place of Heqakheperre Shoshenq in NRT III, the tomb of King Psusennes I of the 21st Dynasty, being a reburial, and this is generally accepted in scholarship. Derry's investigation found evidence of plant growth on the base of Heqakheperre Shoshenq's coffin and within it, with plant remains (rootlets) on the bones of the lower limbs, indicating that his original tomb had become waterlogged. Andrzej Niwiński noted additional water damage to the bottoms of the four silver coffinettes which would have been placed in the canopic chest. The damage to the original burial place of the king required the reburial of his body and part of his funerary equipment in another tomb. As Aidan Dodson writes:

It is abundantly clear that the presence of Shoshenq II within NRT III was the result of a reburial. Apart from the presence of the coffinettes within an extremely mixed group of secondhand jars, the broken condition of the trough of the king's silver coffin showed that it had received rough handling in antiquity. An interesting question is why an original set of canopics was not present, since the reinterment was clearly not a hasty one: shabtis had been brought along, as well as the coffinettes.

David Aston identified a round based travertine jar (M311) from the burial as obviously not being part of the original burial goods. Gerard Broekman noted that the condition of the coffins suggests that the silver falcon-headed coffin was likely not part of the original funerary equipment but was provided for Heqakheperre Shoshenq's reburial in NRT III. He also noted that because the coffinettes were human headed, they should be expected to match an original human-headed coffin, whereas Heqakheperre Shoshenq was found buried in a falcon-headed coffin, once again suggesting that it was a later substitution.

== Identification of King Heqakheperre Shoshenq II ==
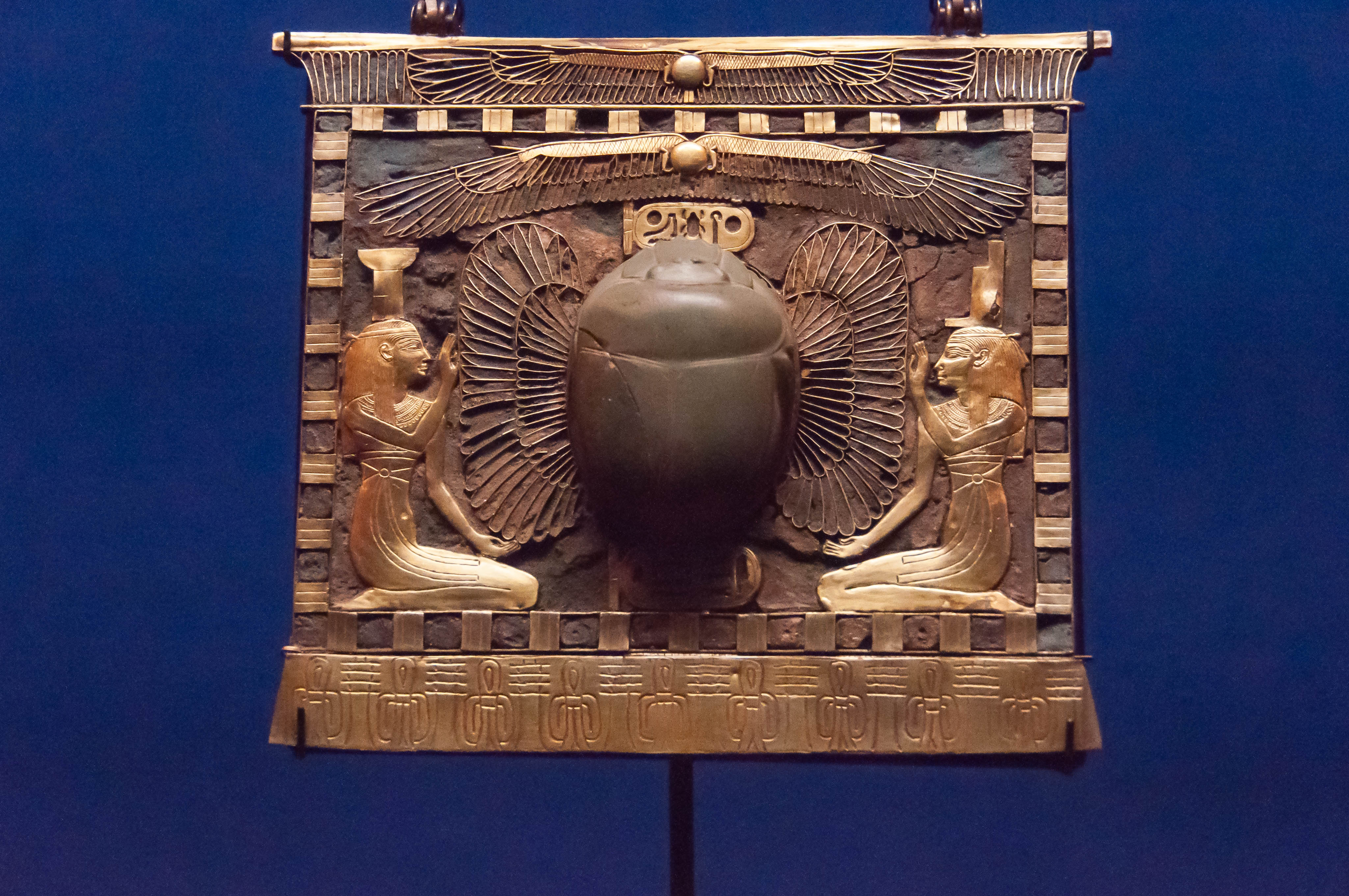
Pectoral of Heqakheperre Shoshenq II from NRT III

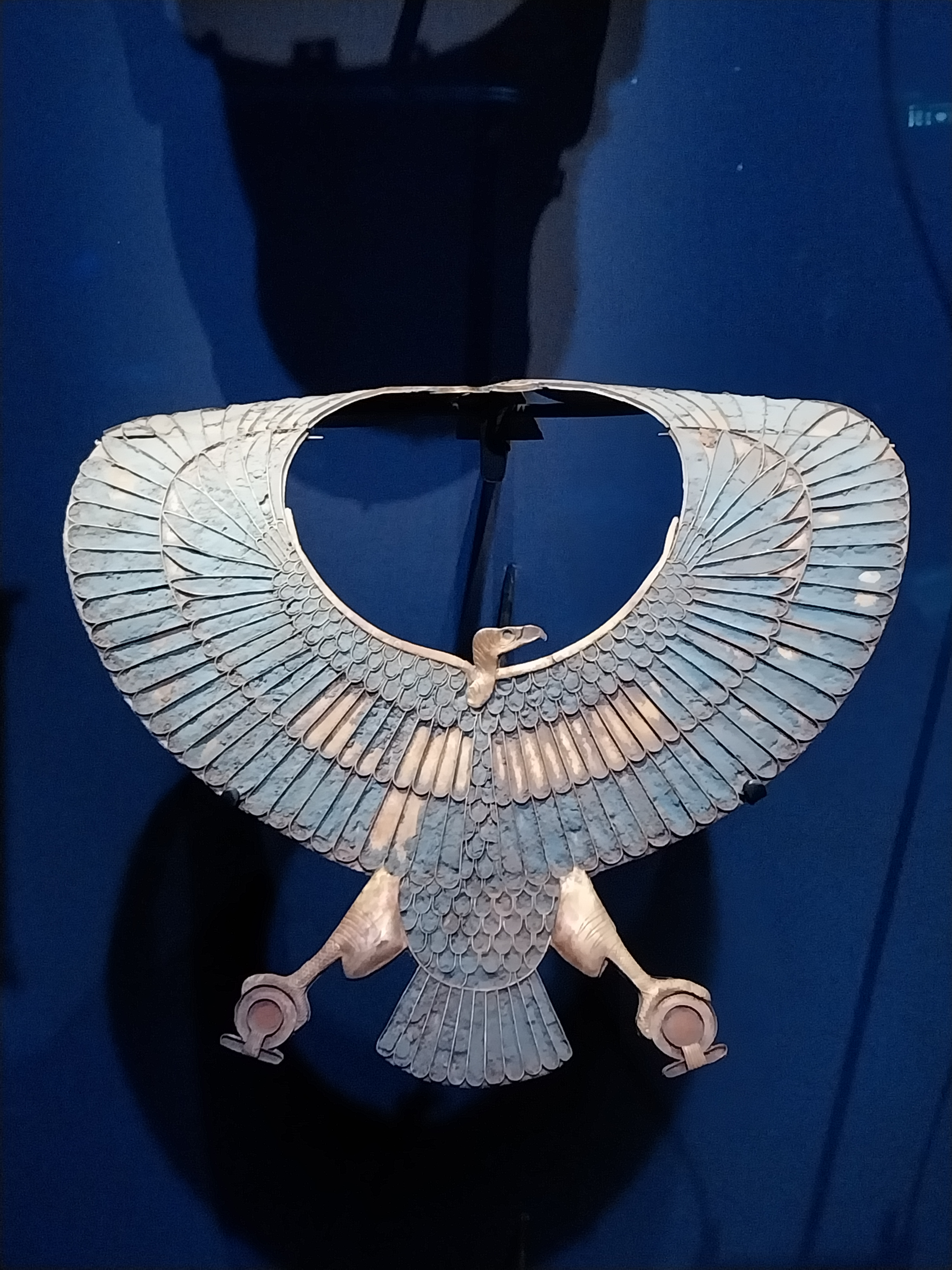
Pectoral from NRT III

Given the limitations of the evidence, on the basis of circumstantial considerations King Heqakheperre Shoshenq has been variously identified with:

- The High Priest of Amun Shoshenq Q, son of King Sekhemkheperre Osorkon I and Maatkare B.
- An otherwise unknown son of King Hedjkheperre Shoshenq I.
- An otherwise unknown son of King Hedjkheperre Takelot I and brother and predecessor of King Usermaatre Osorkon II-sibaste.
- King Hedjkheperre Shoshenq I himself, Heqakheperre Shoshenq representing a variant or posthumous version of the royal name.

Heqakheperre Shoshenq as the High Priest of Amun Shoshenq Q was an identification advocated already by his discoverer, Pierre Montet, and popularized by Kenneth Kitchen. He seems a suitable candidate, though not one that can be proved to have become king, and Heqakheperre Shoshenq's original throne name and heirlooms from Shoshenq I would suggest a placement early in the 22nd Dynasty. In a line of argument he subsequently abandoned, Gerard Broekman considered the reburial of Heqakheperre Shoshenq among kings from the 21st Dynasty in NRT III suggestive of a relationship, which is in fact attested for Shoshenq Q, who was the maternal grandson of the last 21st Dynasty king, Psusennes II. The identification with Shoshenq Q has been criticized, with increasing momentum, on the basis that while a single inscription of Shoshenq Q showed some royal aspirations (most notably, his name in a cartouche and the appending of the epithet Meryamun, "Beloved of Amun"), he was nowhere actually named as king or given a throne name and none of his descendants referred to him as king, something most unlikely if he had ever assumed the kingship.

Kitchen inferred from the regnal dates of Year 3 and Year 33 found on linen bandages from the Ramesseum mummy of the Prophet of Amun Nakhtefmut, which was buried with a leather menat-tab naming King Osorkon I, that this indicated a co-regency between Osorkon I and his son, Shoshenq Q, who would then be best identified with King Heqakheperre Shoshenq, with Year 33 of Osorkon I corresponding to Year 3 of Heqakheperre Shoshenq. Kitchen thought, moreover, that Shoshenq Q/Heqakheperre Shoshenq then died before his father Osorkon I, which is why the latter was succeeded by another son, Takelot I. Kitchen's reconstruction was tentatively accepted by several scholars. However, the case for a co-regency on the basis of this evidence proved elusive. The dates from Nakhtefmut's mummy were not inscribed on the same bandage but rather on separate bandages, and Hartwig Altenmüller's study of the funerary equipment of Egyptian mummies revealed that the bandages produced in quantity over a long span of time and dated many years apart could find their way to the same mummy. For example, another mummy from the reign of Osorkon I, that of Khonsu-maakheru in Hamburg, had bandages dated to Years 11, 12, and 23 of (apparently) Osorkon I; similarly, the mummy of Djedptahiufankh A had bandages dated to Years 5, 10, and 11 of Shoshenq I. As these two near contemporary examples show, the temple priests simply reused whatever old or recycled linens which they could gain access to for their mummification rituals. Altenmüller consequently did not posit any co-regency and assigned Year 33 to Osorkon I and Year 3 to his successor Takelot I. Accordingly, most scholars have abandoned the hypothetical co-regency between Osorkon I and his son, although Kitchen continued to maintain his stance.

An independent reign of Heqakheperre Shoshenq between those of Osorkon I and Takelot I might help vindicate the assertion found in Sextus Julius Africanus' epithome of Manetho, that three kings reigning for a total of 25 (or 29) years intervened between Osorthōn and Takelōthis. This has encouraged some scholars to consider Heqakheperre Shoshenq IIa, Tutkheperre Shoshenq IIb, and Maatkheperre Shoshenq IIc attractive candidates for these kings. However, although Africanus' epithome of Manetho is apparently more faithful to the original work than others, this is not verifiable and there is no guarantee that Manetho's order of kings was correct. Therefore, this set of three unnamed kings could be potentially accounted for with other monarchs, as done by Jürgen von Beckerath, with only one of the three Shoshenqs IIa-IIc.

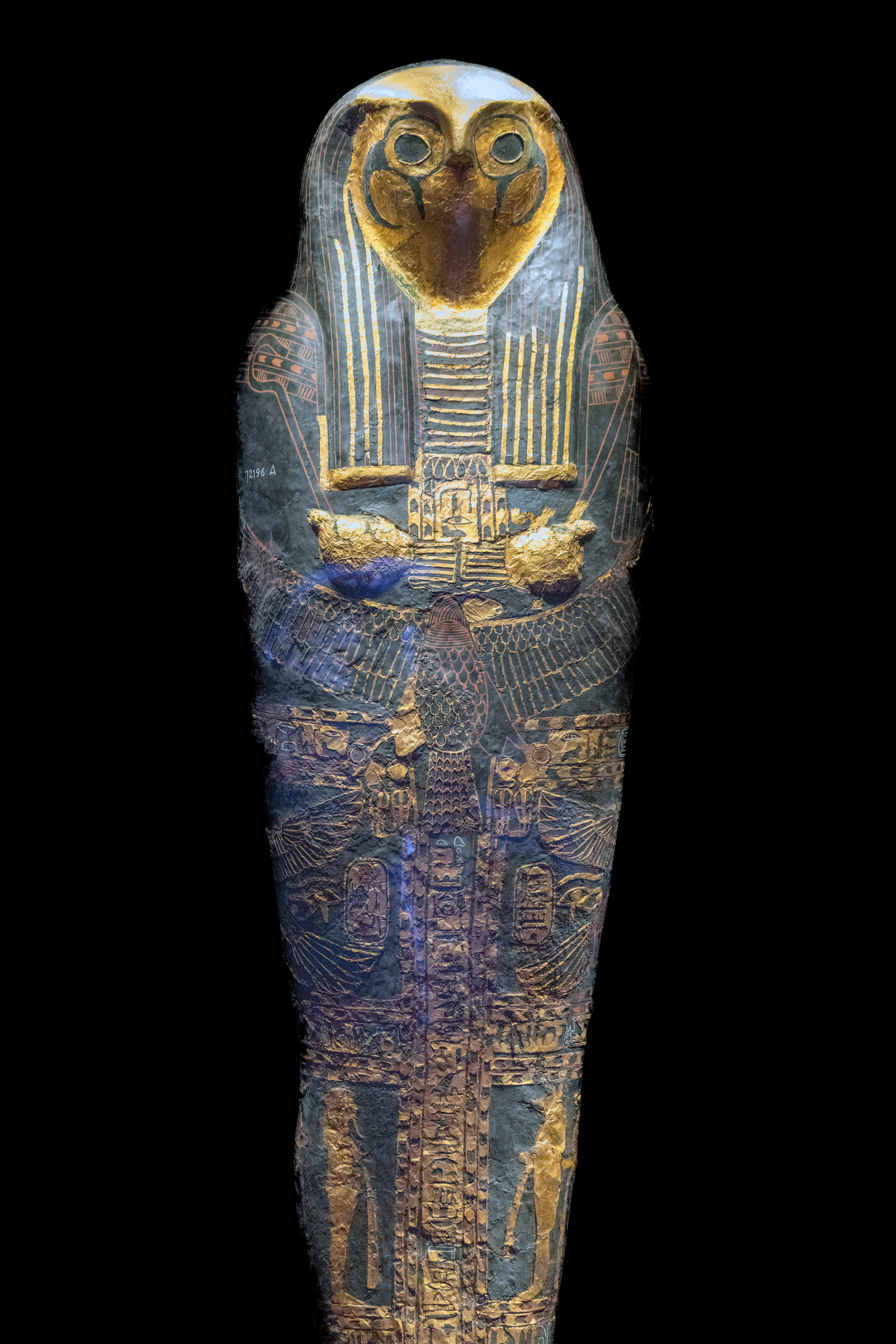
Cartonnage of Heqakheperre Shoshenq from NRT III

Heqakheperre Shoshenq as an unattested son of Shoshenq I was a possibility raised by Karl Jansen-Winkeln, on the basis of the exclusive use of "heirlooms" from Shoshenq I in his burial, making it unlikely that Heqakheperre Shoshenq would have reigned after Osorkon I or Takelot I: "As the individuals interred in the royal tombs often bore objects belonging to their parents, this king is probably a son of Shoshenq I." Jansen-Winkeln also rejected Kitchen's identification of Heqakheperre Shoshenq with Shoshenq Q on other grounds, and argued that the latter must have been Maatkheperre Shoshenq IIc instead. David Aston agreed in principle, that Heqakheperre Shoshenq must have been "a close successor of Sheshonq I," although he placed his reign (alongside those of Tutkheperre Shoshenq and Maatkheperre Shoshenq) between those of Osorkon I and Takelot I.

Heqakheperre Shoshenq as an unattested son of Takelot I was a possibility raised by Jürgen von Beckerath and Norbert Dautzenberg, who had identified Shoshenq Q as Maatkheperre Shoshenq IIc instead, and sought a suitable place for Heqakheperre Shoshenq within the first half of the 22nd Dynasty, where his early "heirlooms" (from Shoshenq I) and his falcon-headed sarcophagus would seem to belong. With King Osorkon I's son Shoshenq Q and King Usermaatre Osorkon II-sibaste's son Shoshenq D (who died as High Priest of Ptah at Memphis) not available, a hypothetical son of Takelot I was considered a possibility. Later, Frédéric Payraudeau reached the same tentative conclusion, although he denied the existence of Maatkheperre Shoshenq IIc (considering him a mere miswriting of Hedjkheperre Shoshenq I's name) and considered Shoshenq Q a non-reigning prince and high priest.

The falcon-headed coffin and cartonnage of Heqakheperre Shoshenq have been compared to the coffin of Osorkon I's vizier Iken, the remains of the coffin of Osorkon II at Tanis, and the sarcophagus of Osorkon II's early contemporary, King Harsiese from Medinet Habu in western Thebes, suggesting a basic date between the reigns of Osorkon I and Osorkon II for Heqakheperre Shoshenq's burial. If this basic artistic correspondence can be taken as a guide, Heqakheperre Shoshenq could have been a contemporary of King Harsiese and King Osorkon II, both of them grandsons of Osorkon I, which is compatible with his placement as a son or successor of Takelot I, as in the above scenario.

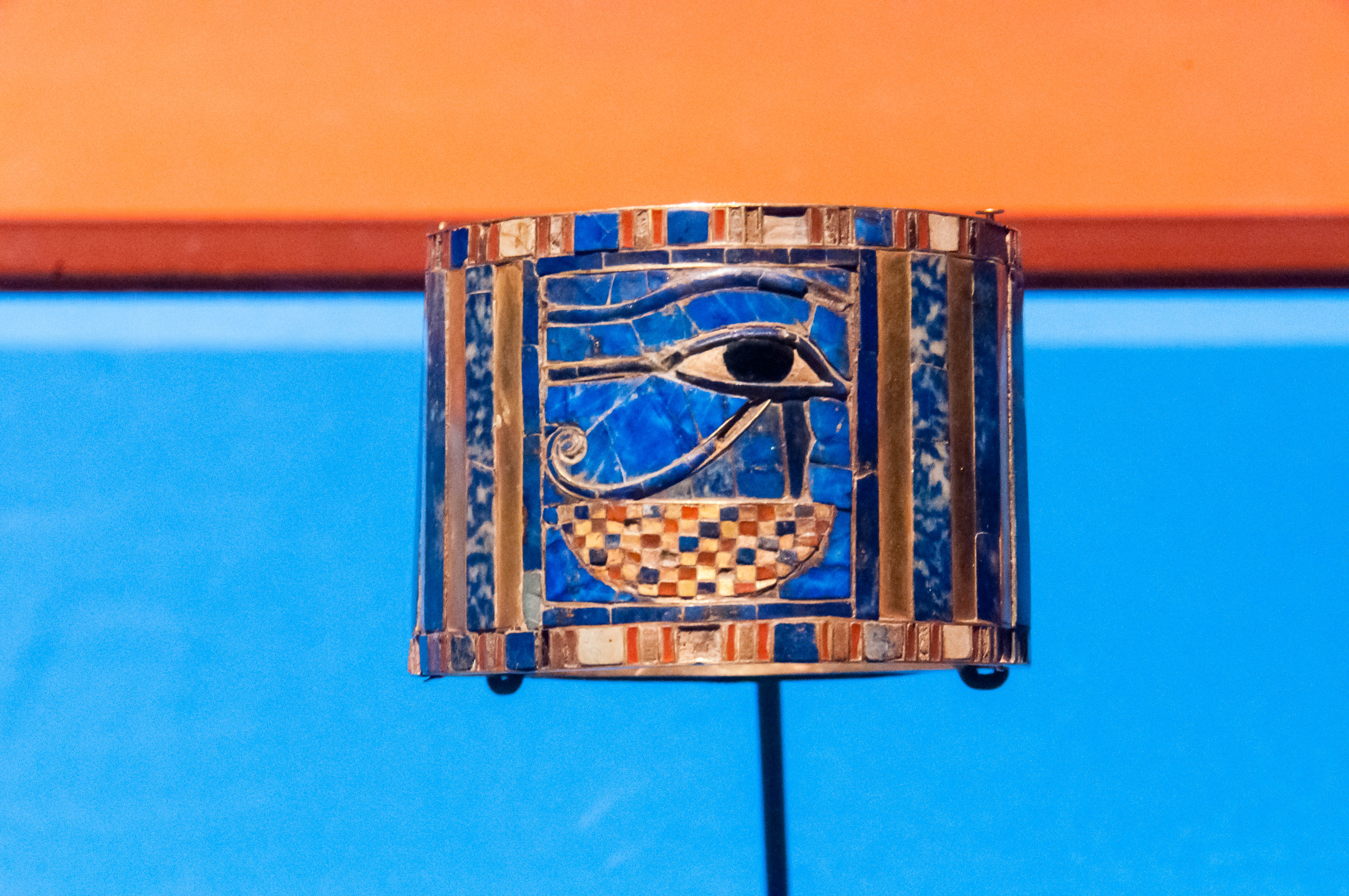
Bracelet of Hedjkheperre Shoshenq I featuring the Eye of Horus from NRT III

Heqakheperre Shoshenq as another name for Hedjkheperre Shoshenq I was a possibility first mooted in passing by Sir Alan Gardiner in 1961. Just as succinctly dismissed by Kitchen, it was then restated with arguments by Helen Jacquet-Gordon, who stressed in particular that none of the descendants of the High Priest Shoshenq Q (whom Kitchen had equated with King Heqakheperre Shoshenq) referred to him as king. The case for identifying Heqakheperre Shoshenq with Hedjkheperre Shoshenq I was advanced again by Gerard Broekman, who had previously followed Kitchen's hypothesis. This suggestion was opposed on the grounds that there was no plausible explanation for Shoshenq I changing his throne name and especially that a calcite canopic chest inscribed with his familiar throne name Hedjkheperre is documented, at Berlin, having never been part of the burial in NRT III.

The argument was taken up by Andrzej Niwiński, who stressed the secondary character of Heqakheperre Shoshenq's burial (i.e., reburial) in NRT III at Tanis and the fact that the supposed "heirlooms" referring to Hedjkheperre Shoshenq I were located more immediately and intimately on the body of the deceased than the objects referring to Heqakheperre Shoshenq, which were located on the outside of the mummy: on an added pectoral atop the bandages, on the headrest, cartonnage, and coffin, suggesting they were provided secondarily during the reburial. Niwiński also proposed that Hedjkheperre Shoshenq I varied his royal names over time and in different places, citing the epithet Setepenre, which was altered to Setepenamun and Setepenptah in several instances, depending on geographical or cultic context, and concluded that the throne names Heqakheperre, Tutkheperre, and Maatkheperre must have all applied to him. Advancing his position with more evidence, Gerard Broekman found that the king's original coffin had been human shaped, like the four accompanying silver coffinettes, which were found placed secondarily in vases rather than arranged in a canopic chest, but which fit perfectly within the calcite canopic chest of Hedjkheperre Shoshenq I now in Berlin, suggesting they had been made for it. He also stressed the more intimate connection between the objects inscribed for Hedjkheperre Shoshenq I and the deceased, than the objects inscribed for Heqakheperre Shoshenq. Broekman drew attention to the still unpublished royal names attested on ostraca from Umm el-Qaʿāb at Abydos, which include Shoshenq I, Osorkon I, Tutkheperre Shoshenq IIb, Maatkheperre Shoshenq IIc, Takelot I, Osorkon II, Shoshenq III, and Harsiese, but not Heqakheperre Shoshenq IIa, suggesting that the latter did not exist as an individual king. With attestations of Heqakheperre Shoshenq thus confined to a portion of his burial goods, Broekman concludes that Hedjkheperre Shoshenq I's remains and part of his funerary items were transferred from an original tomb, probably at Memphis, where he had a mortuary temple, to be reburied in Tomb NRT III at Tanis. Others, like the calcite canopic chest, were left behind. In the process of reburial and while repairing damage caused by water, the king was given some new funerary goods including the falcon-headed cartonnage and silver coffin, which were posthumously inscribed with a new throne name, Heqakheperre, in the reign of his great-grandson Osorkon II, perhaps in part to avoid reference to his father, Hedjkheperre Takelot I, or cousin and contemporary, Hedjkheperre Harsiese.

== Chronology ==
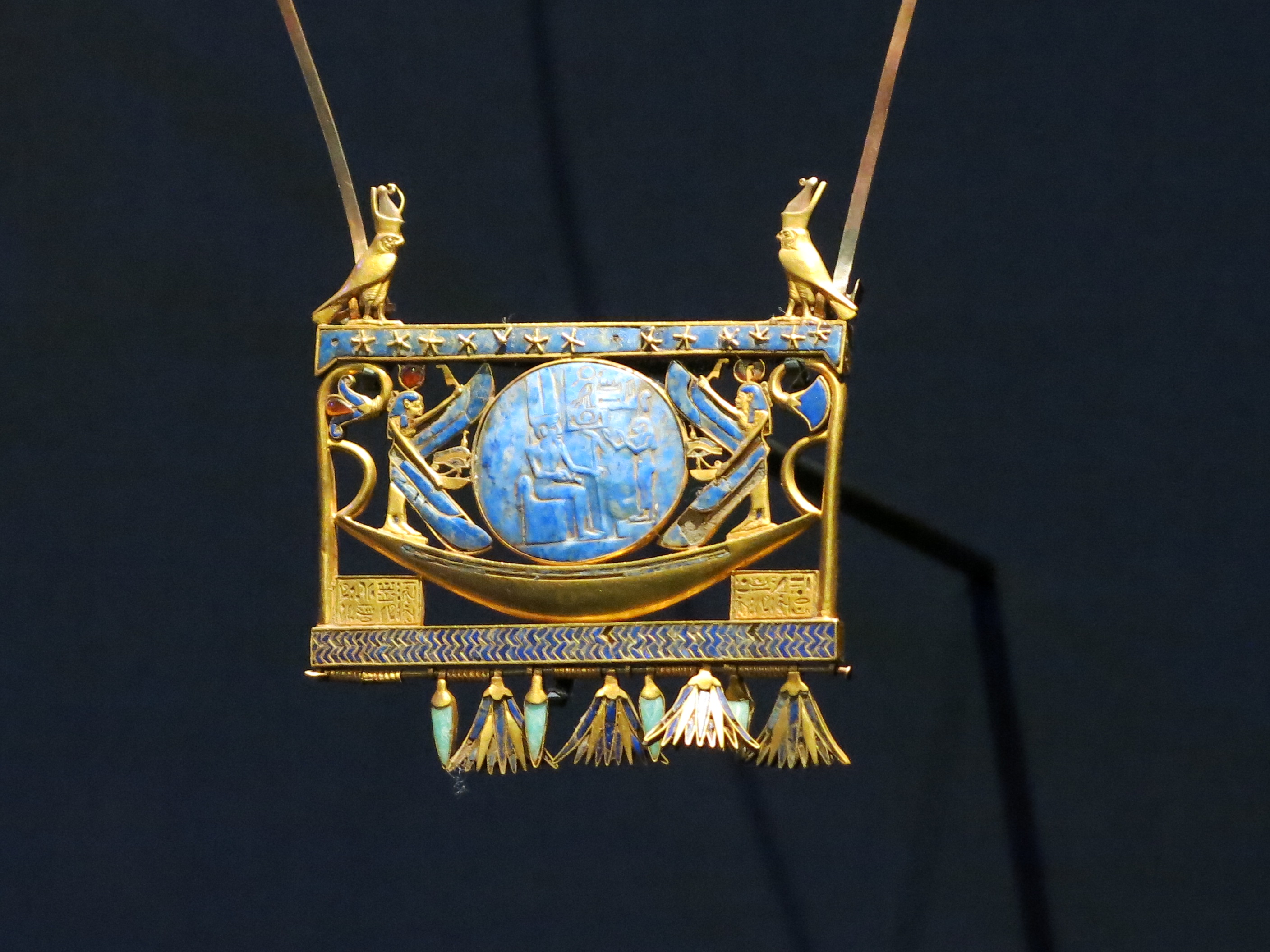
A pectoral of the Great Chief of Ma Shoshenq (the future Hedjkheperre Shoshenq I) featuring a solar barque from NRT III

The chronological placement of King Heqakheperre Shoshenq IIa depends on his identification, which varies significantly from scholar to scholar, as discussed above. Scholars who attribute an independent reign to him generally give him one or two years on the throne (e.g., 877–875 BC in Beckerath 1997), although the complete absence of attestations of a Heqakheperre Shoshenq outside his burial would seem to suggest an extremely short reign. Ampler allowances of time tend to be in conjunction with other rulers (like Tutkheperre Shoshenq IIb and Maatkheperre Shoshenq IIc) and trying to not exaggerate the reign-length of Osorkon II. If he was an ephemeral successor of King Osorkon I, he would have reigned in c. 887 BC. If a short-lived successor of Takelot I, he would have reigned in c. 873 BC. If he was identical to Hedjkheperre Shoshenq I, he would have reigned in c. 943–922 BC and would have been reburied with a new throne name some five decades later.

== Bibliography ==
- Altenmüller, Hartwig 2000, "Die Mumienbinden des Chonsu-maacheru" in Alt-Ägypten 30: 113-126.online ISBN 3-86097-540-4
- Aston, David 2009a, "Takeloth II, A King of the Herakleopolitan/Theban Twenty-Third Dynasty Revisited," in: G. P. F. Broekman, R. J. Demarée and O. E. Kaper (eds.), The Libyan Period in Egypt: Historical and Cultural Studies into the 21st–24th Dynasties, Leiden: 1-28. online
- Aston, David A. 2009b, Burial Assemblages of Dynasty 21-25: Chronology—Typology—Developments, Vienna: Österreichische Akademie der Wissenchaften.
- Beckerath, Jürgen von 1997, Chronologie des pharaonischen Ägypten, Mainz am Rhein: Philipp von Zabern.
- Bonhême, Marie-Ange 1995, "Les Chechanquides: Qui, Combien?," Bulletin de la société française d'Égyptologie 134: 50-71. ISSN 0037-9379
- Brier, Bob 1994, Egyptian Mummies: Unravelling the Secrets of an Ancient Art New York: William Morrow.
- Broekman, Gerard P. F. 2006, "On the Identity of King Shoshenq buried in the Vestibule of the Tomb of Psusennes I in Tanis (NRT III)" Part I, Göttinger Miszellen 211: 11-20.
- Broekman, Gerard P. F. 2007, "On the Identity of King Shoshenq buried in the Vestibule of the Tomb of Psusennes I in Tanis (NRT III)" Part II, Göttinger Miszellen 212: 9-28.
- Broekman, Gerard P. F. 2009, "Falcon-headed coffins and cartonnages," Journal of Egyptian Archaeology 95: 67-81.
- Broekman, Gerard P. F. 2011, "The Egyptian Chronology from the Start of the Twenty-Second until the End of the Twenty-Fifth Dynasty: Facts, Suppositions and Arguments," Journal of Egyptian History 4: 40-80.
- Broekman, Gerard P. F. 2012/2013, "Manetho's 'Three other kings' between Osorthôn and Takelôthis and their importance for the chronology of the Third Intermediate Period and the New Kingdom PDF," Ägypten und Levante 22/23: 349-351.
- Broekman, Gerard P. F. 2018, "On the identity of King Shoshenq Heqakheperre, buried in royal tomb NRT III in Tanis: a reconsideration," Göttinger Miszellen 254: 25-36.
- Broekman, Gerard P. F. 2019, "Royal shabtis from Tanis," Göttinger Miszellen 257: 17-24.
- Brunton, Guy 1939, "Some Notes on the Burial of Shashanq Heqa-Kheper-Re," Annales du Service des Antiquités de l'Égypte 39: 541-547.
- Clayton, Peter A 1994, Chronicle of the Pharaohs: The Reign-by-Reign Record of the Rulers and Dynasties of Ancient Egypt, London: Thames & Hudson.
- Dautzenberg, Norbert 1995: "Bemerkungen zu Schoschenq II., Takeloth II. und Pedubastis II," Göttinger Miszellen 144: 21-29.
- Derry, Douglas E. 1939, "Note on the Remains of Shashanq," Annales du Service des Antiquités de l'Égypte 39: 549-551.
- Dodson, Aidan 1994, "The Canopic Equipment of the Kings of Egypt," London: Kegan Paul Int'l.
- Dodson, Aidan 2009, "The Transition between the 21st and 22nd Dynasties revisited," in: G. P. F. Broekman, R. J. Demarée and O. E. Kaper (eds.), The Libyan Period in Egypt: Historical and Cultural Studies into the 21st–24th Dynasties, Leiden: 103-112. online
- Dodson, Aidan 2012, Afterglow of Empire: Egypt from the Fall of the New Kingdom to the Saite Renaissance, Cairo.
- Edwards, I. E. S. 1982, "Egypt: From the Twenty Second to the Twenty Fourth Dynasty," in: John Boardman et al. (eds.), The Cambridge Ancient History 3/1: The Prehistory of the Balkans’ and the Middle East and the Aegean world, tenth to eighth centuries B.C., Cambridge: 534-581.
- Effland, Ute, and Andreas Effland 2018, "Umm el-Qaab (Abydos), Ägypten. Untersuchungen zum Osiriskult in Abydos vom Alten Reich bis in die Spätzeit. Die Arbeiten der Jahre 2017 und 2018," e-Forschungerichte des DAI 2: 47-51. online
- Gardiner, Alan 1961, Egypt of the Pharaohs, Oxford.
- Hobson, Christine 1987, Exploring the World of the Pharaohs: A complete Guide to Ancient Egypt, London: Thames & Hudson.
- Hornung, Erik, Rolf Krauss, and David A. Warburton (eds.) 2006, Ancient Egyptian Chronology, Leiden: Brill.
- Jacquet-Gordon, Helen 1975, "Review of K. A. Kitchen, The Third Intermediate Period in Egypt," Bibliotheca Orientalis 32: 358-360. online
- Jansen-Winkeln, Karl 1995, "Historische Probleme der 3. Zwischenzeit," Journal of Egyptian Archaeology 81: 129-149. online
- Jansen-Winkeln, Karl 2006, "The Chronology of the Third Intermediate Period: Dyns. 22–24," in Erik Hornung, Rolf Krauss, and David A. Warburton (eds.), Ancient Egyptian Chronology, Leiden: Brill, pp.237-238
- Jansen-Winkeln, Karl 2007, Inschriften der Spätzeit. Teil II: Die 22.–24. Dynastie, Wiesbaden: Harrassowitz.
- Kaper, Olaf E. 2008, "The Libyan Period in Egypt," Egyptian Archaeology 32: 38-39.
- Kitchen, Kenneth A. 1995: The Third Intermediate Period in Egypt (1100–650 BC), 3rd ed., Warminster: Aris & Phillips.
- Kitchen, Kenneth A. 2009: "The Third Intermediate Period in Egypt: An Overview of Fact & Fiction," in: G. P. F. Broekman, R. J. Demarée and O. E. Kaper (eds.), The Libyan Period in Egypt: Historical and Cultural Studies into the 21st–24th Dynasties, Leiden: 161-202.
- Lange, Eva R. 2004, "Ein Neuer König Schoschenk in Bubastis", Göttinger Miszellen 203: 65–72. online
- Leprohon, Ronald J. 2013, The Great Name: Ancient Egyptian Royal Titulary, Society of Biblical Literature: Atlanta.
- Montet, Pierre 1947, La nécropole royale de Tanis 1: Les constructions et le tombeau d'Osorkon II à Tanis, Paris.
- Montet, Pierre 1951, La nécropole royale de Tanis 2: Les constructions et le tombeau de Psousennès I à Tanis, Paris.
- Müller, Hans Wolfgang, and Eberhard Thiem 1999, Gold of the Pharaohs, Ithaca, NY: Cornell University Press.
- Niwiński, Andrzej 2013, "Multiplicity of Shoshenqs in the Early Twenty-second Dynasty: A Good Reason to Apply Ockham’s Razor Principle," Études et travaux, Institut des cultures méditerranéennes et orientales de l'Académie polonaise des sciences 26: 488-499. online
- Payraudeau, Frédéric 2014, Administration, société et pouvoir à Thèbes sous la XXIIe dynastie bubastide, Cairo: Institut français d'archéologie orientale.
- Payraudeau, Frédéric 2020, L'Égypte et la vallée du Nil Tome 3: Les époques tardives (1069–332 av. J.-C.), Paris: Presses universitaires de France.
- Sagrillo, Troy L. 2009, "The geographic origins of the "Bubastide" Dynasty and possible locations for the royal residence and burial place of Shoshenq I," in: G. P. F. Broekman, R. J. Demarée and O. E. Kaper (eds.), The Libyan Period in Egypt: Historical and Cultural Studies into the 21st–24th Dynasties, Leiden: 341-351.
- Schneider, Thomas 2010, "Contributions to the Chronology of the New Kingdom and the Third Intermediate Period," Ägypten und Levante 20: 373-403.
- Waddell, W. G. (transl.) 1940, Manetho, Cambridge, MA: Loeb Classical Library.
