= TT18 =

Theban Tomb

Theban tomb TT18
- Burial site of Baki
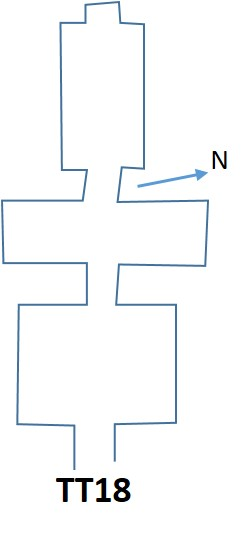

- Location within Egypt
- Location: Dra' Abu el-Naga', Theban Necropolis
- Excavated by: Ghautier (ca 1908)
- ← Previous; TT17 Next → TT19

G29 k i
Baki
in hieroglyphs
Era: New Kingdom
(1550–1069 BC)

The Theban Tomb TT18 is located in Dra' Abu el-Naga', part of the Theban Necropolis, on the west bank of the Nile, opposite to Luxor. It is the burial place of the ancient Egyptian Baki (or perhaps Bak), who was Chief Weigher of the Gold of Amun during the early Eighteenth Dynasty.

Baki's father was a scribe of counting of cattle of Queen Ahmose Nefertari. The hall of the tomb is decorated with scenes showing a banquet and offering brought before Baki and his family. Other scenes show Baki and his family fishing and fowling.

The tomb contains some graffiti that links Psusennes II's royal name with his successor, Shoshenq I.

== See also ==
- List of Theban tombs
