= Siamun =

Egyptian pharaoh

- Psinaches (Manetho)?
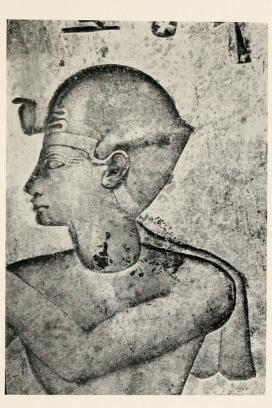
- Siamun on a relief, from Memphis

Pharaoh
- Reign: 985–966 BC
- Predecessor: Osorkon the Elder
- Successor: Psusennes II
Royal titulary
Horus name
Kanakht Merimaat
K3-nḫt-mrj-M3ˁt
Strong bull, beloved of Maat
G5	E2 D40 C10 mr
Second Horus name:
Kanekhet Merimaat Sa[meri]enamun Periemkhawef
K3-nḫt-mrj-M3ˁt-s3-[mrj]-n-Jmn prj-m-ḥˁw=f
Strong bull, beloved of Maat,
[beloved] son of Amun, who has emerged from his body
G5	E2 D44 C10 U6 H8 U8 S3 M17 Y5 N35 O1 D21 D54 G17 V28 D36 M33 I9
Prenomen
Netjerkheperre Setepenamun
Nṯrj-ḫpr-Rˁ-stp-n-Jmn
Divine is the manifestation of Ra, the chosen one of Amun
M23 t L2 t < N5 R8 L1 i mn n U21 n >
Second prenomen:
Netjekheperre Meriamun
Nṯrj-ḫpr-Rˁ-mrj-Jmn
Divine is the manifestation of Ra, beloved of Amun
M23 t L2 t < N5 R8 L1 i mn n U7 >
Nomen
Siamun
S3 Jmn
Son of Amun
G39 N5 < i mn n G39 Z1 >
Second nomen:
Nesutsiamun
Nswt s3 Jmn
King, son of Amun
G39 N5 < M23 X1 N35 G39 Z1 M17 Y5 N35 G7 >
- Consort: Karimala?
- Died: 967 BC
- Burial: Unknown, possibly reburied in NRT III at Tanis
- Dynasty: 21st Dynasty

Neterkheperre or Netjerkheperre-Setepenamun Siamun was the sixth pharaoh of Egypt during the Twenty-first Dynasty. He built extensively in Lower Egypt for a king of the Third Intermediate Period and is regarded as one of the most powerful rulers of the Twenty-first Dynasty after Psusennes I. Siamun's prenomen, Netjerkheperre-Setepenamun, means "Divine is The Manifestation of Ra, Chosen of Amun" while his name means 'son of Amun.'

== Family ==
Siamun was the son of Psusennes I and born to [...]. He may have been a child when his father died, prompting Osorkon the Elder to act as a king-regent. Siamun might then have married Karimala, daughter of Osorkon the Elder. Furthermore, Siamun was not succeeded by a son, but a cousin Psusennes II, who in turn was succeeded by Shoshenq I, nephew of Osorkon the Elder, indicating a crisis in the order of succession.

Very little is known of the family relationships of Siamun. In 1999, Chris Bennett made a case for a Queen Karimala known from an inscription in the temple of Semna being the daughter of Osorkon the Elder. She is called both 'King's Daughter" and "King's Wife". Her name suggests she may have been Libyan, which would fit in with her being the daughter of Osorkon the Elder (Manetho's Osochor). Given the date of the inscription (a year 14), she might have been the queen of either king Siamun or king Psusennes II. Bennett prefers a marriage to Siamun, because in that case she could have taken over the position of Viceroy of Kush Neskhons as a religious figurehead in Nubia after the death of the latter in year 5 of king Siamun. What is more, a marriage to her might explain how Siamun, an Egyptian, judging by his nomen, came to succeed a clearly Libyan Osochor.

== Manetho ==
Siamun is often identified with the last king of Manetho's 21st Dynasty, "Psinaches". This king is credited with a reign of only nine years, which subsequently had to be amended to [1]9 years on the basis of an inscription from the Karnak Priestly Annals mentioning a Year 17 of king Siamun. However, there is no real basis for interpreting the name "Psinaches" as a corruption of the name Netjerkheperre-setepenamun Siamun. Recently, it has been suggested that Manetho's "Psinaches" might rather be a reference to king Tutkheperre Shoshenq as the direct successor of Manetho's Osorkon the Elder.

== Reign length ==
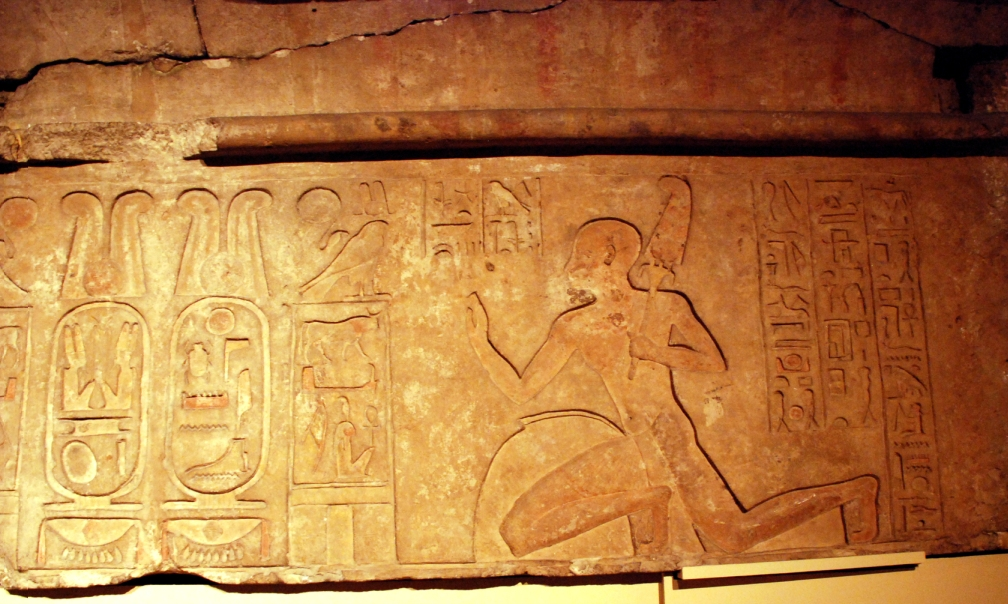
Ankhefenmut adores the royal name of pharaoh Siamun in this doorway lintel.

The highest attested year for Siamun is a Year 17 the first month of Shemu day [lost], mentioned in fragment 3B, lines 3-5 from the Karnak Priestly Annals. It records the induction of Hori, son of Nespaneferhor into the Priesthood at Karnak. This date was a lunar Tepi Shemu feast day. Based on the calculation of this lunar Tepi Shemu feast, Year 17 of Siamun has been shown by the German Egyptologist Rolf Krauss to be equivalent to 970 BC. Hence, Siamun would have taken the throne about 16 years earlier in 986 BC. A stela dated to Siamun's Year 16 records a land-sale between some minor priests of Ptah at Memphis.

The Year 17 inscription is an important palaeographical development because it is the first time in Egyptian recorded history that the word pharaoh was employed as a title and linked directly to a king's royal name: as in Pharaoh Siamun here. Henceforth, references to Pharaoh Psusennes II (Siamun's successor), Pharaoh Shoshenq I, Pharaoh Osorkon I, and so forth become commonplace. Prior to Siamun's reign and all throughout the Middle and New Kingdom, the word pharaoh referred only to the office of the king.

== Monuments and campaign in Canaan ==
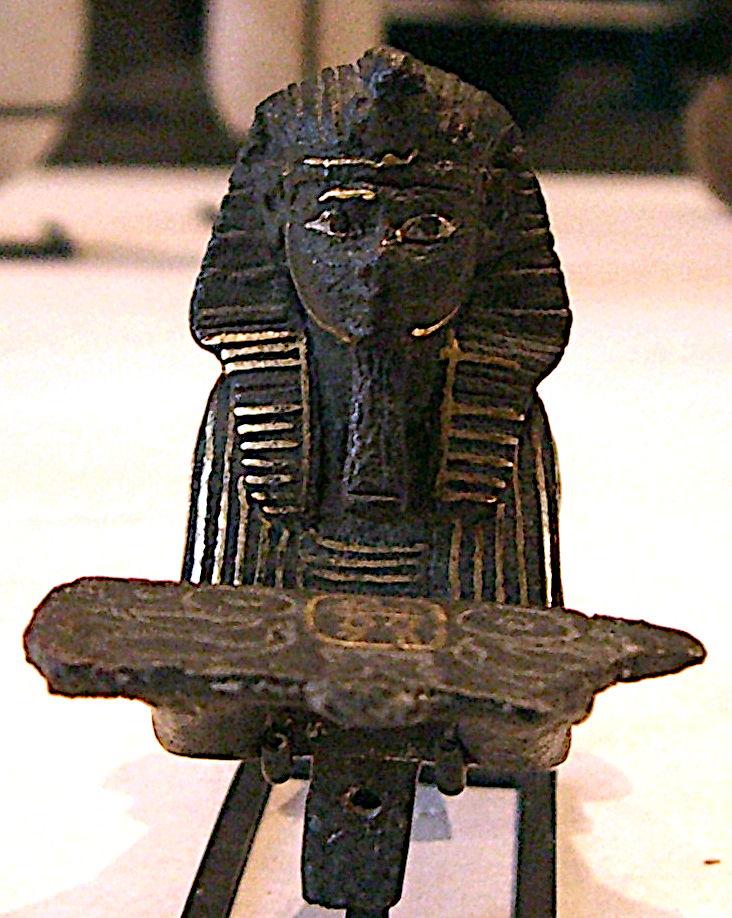
Bronze Sphinx of Siamun, Louvre Museum.

According to the French Egyptologist Nicolas Grimal, Siamun doubled the size of the Temple of Amun at Tanis and initiated various works at the Temple of Horus at Mesen. He also built at Heliopolis and at Piramesse where a surviving stone block bears his name. Siamun constructed and dedicated a new temple to Amun at Memphis with 6 stone columns and doorways which bears his royal name. Finally, he bestowed numerous favours onto the Memphite Priests of Ptah. In Upper Egypt, he generally appears eponymously on a few Theban monuments although Siamun's High Priest of Amun at Thebes, Pinedjem II, organised the removal and re-burial of the New Kingdom royal mummies from the Valley of the Kings in several hidden mummy caches at Deir El-Bahari Tomb DB320 for protection from looting. These activities are dated from Year 1 to Year 10 of Siamun's reign.

One fragmentary but well known surviving triumphal relief scene from the Temple of Amun at Tanis depicts an Egyptian pharaoh smiting his enemies with a mace. The king's name is explicitly given as [(Neterkheperre Setepenamun) Siamun, beloved of Am(un)] in the relief and there can be no doubt that this person was Siamun as the eminent British Egyptologist Kenneth Kitchen stresses in his book, On the Reliability of the Old Testament. Siamun appears here "in typical pose brandishing a mace to strike down prisoners(?) now lost at the right except for two arms and hands, one of which grasps a remarkable double-bladed ax by its socket." The writer observes that this double bladed axe or 'halberd' has a flared crescent shaped blade which is close in form to the Aegean influenced double axe but is quite distinct from the Palestinian/Canaanite double headed axe which has a different shape that resembles an X. Thus, Kitchen concludes Siamun's foes were the Philistines who were descendants of the Aegean-based Sea Peoples and that Siamun was commemorating his recent victory over them at Gezer by depicting himself in a formal battle scene relief at the Temple in Tanis. Paul S. Ash has challenged this theory, stating that Siamun's relief portrays a fictitious battle. He points out that in Egyptian reliefs Philistines are never shown holding an axe, and that there is no archaeological evidence for Philistines using axes. He also argues that there is nothing in the relief to connect it with Philistia or the Levant.

Aside from the Egyptian reliefs, excavations from Gezer have revealed evidence of the Egyptian destruction of the city in the 10th century BC, concurrent with the period of Siamun's reign.

== Burial ==
Although Siamun's original royal tomb has never been located, it has been proposed that he is one of "two completely decayed mummies in the antechamber of NRT-III (Psusennes I's tomb)" on the basis of ushabtis found on them which bore this king's name. Siamun's original tomb may have been inundated by the Nile which compelled a reburial of this king in Psusennes I's tomb.

== Siamun and Solomon ==
It has been suggested that Siamun was the unnamed pharaoh of the Bible who gave in marriage his daughter to king Solomon in order to seal an alliance between the two (1Kings 3:1), and later conquered Gezer and gave it to Solomon as well (1Kings 9:16). This identification is supported by Kenneth Kitchen and William G. Dever, but has been challenged by other scholars such as Paul S. Ash and Mark W. Chavalas, with the latter stating that "it is impossible to conclude which Egyptian monarch ruled concurrently with David and Solomon".

Edward Lipiński suggested that "The attempt at relating the destruction of Gezer to the hypothetical relationship between Siamun and Solomon cannot be justified factually, since Siamun's death precedes Solomon's accession." Lipiński also argued that the then-unfortified Gezer was destroyed late in the 10th century, and that its taker was most likely pharaoh Shoshenq I of the 22nd Dynasty.

Dever, however, challenges these positions, arguing that Siamun reigned from 978 to 959 BCE, coinciding with Solomon's early years of reign and that such diplomatic marriages are well attested in the ancient Near East; he also states that archaeological excavations in Gezer show that the site had been refortified in 950 BCE, during Solomon's reign, only to be later destroyed by Shoshenq I, during his raid against Israel.

Moreover, according to Kenneth Kitchen, the occupation of Gezer by Pharaoh Siamun is attested by a triumphal relief scene from the Temple of Amun at Tanis depicts an Egyptian pharaoh smiting his enemies with a mace. The king's name is explicitly given as [(Neterkheperre Setepenamun) Siamun, beloved of Am(un)] in the relief and there can be no doubt that this person was Siamun. Siamun appears here "in typical pose brandishing a mace to strike down prisoners(?) now lost at the right except for two arms and hands, one of which grasps a remarkable double-bladed ax by its socket." The writer observes that this double bladed axe or 'halberd' has a flared crescent shaped blade which is close in form to the Aegean influenced double axe but is quite distinct from the Palestinian/Canaanite double headed axe which has a different shape that resembles an X. Thus, Kitchen concludes Siamun's foes were the Philistines who were descendants of the Aegean-based Sea Peoples and that Siamun was commemorating his recent victory over them at Gezer by depicting himself in a formal battle scene relief at the Temple in Tanis. This conclusion is also shared by Krystal V. L. Pierce, who also points to a scarab of Siamun discovered in Tell el Far'ah as further evidence for his campaign in the Levant.

Paul S. Ash has challenged this theory, stating that Siamun's relief portrays a fictitious battle. He points out that in Egyptian reliefs Philistines are never shown holding an axe, and that there is no archaeological evidence for Philistines using axes. He also argues that there is nothing in the relief to connect it with Philistia or the Levant. In response, Kitchen argues that Ash's argument is "full of errors about triumph scenes", that the reason no other Egyptian reliefs show Philistines holding an axe is because "no other triumph scene with Philistines is available to compare with Siamun's" and that his campaign must have taken place in the Levant because the axe is neither Nubian nor Lybian, the only possible alternatives.
