= Iuput =

Ancient Egyptian prince and High Priest of Amun

- High Priest of Amun
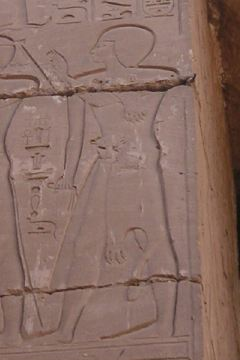
- Iuput on the Bubastite Portal at Karnak
Egyptian name
E9 w p t
- Predecessor: Psusennes III
- Successor: Shoshenq Q
- Dynasty: 22nd Dynasty
- Pharaoh: Shoshenq I and Osorkon I
- Father: Shoshenq I
- Children: Nesikhonsupakhered i

Iuput, designated Iuput A, was High Priest of Amun from 944 to 924 BCE, during the reigns of his father Shoshenq I and his brother Osorkon I.

Iuput held a variety of titles including High Priest of Amun, generalissimo and army-leader and Governor of Upper Egypt.

It is not known who Iuput's mother was, but it is assumed that Lady Tashepenbast was his sister. Nimlot B and Osorkon I were (half-)brothers of Iuput. Iuput's daughter by an unknown wife was named Nesikhonsupakhered. She was the wife of Djedkhonsiufankh, who was a fourth priest of Amun.

Presumably upon Iuput's demise, his brother Osorkon I appointed his own son Shoshenq Q as the new High Priest of Amun at Thebes.

== Other Priests and Priestesses ==
From Iuput's time a handful of other people are known to have held positions in the Amun priesthood.

Djedptahiufankh A served as second and third priest of Amun in ca 945-935 BCE. Djedptahiufankh was called the "King's Son of Ramesses" and "King's Son of the Lord of the Two Lands". He may have been related to the previous dynasty. Djedptahiufankh was buried in the cache in DB320.

Nesy who was a chief of the Mahasun (a Libyan tribe) served as fourth priest of Amun.
