= Karl Jansen-Winkeln =

German Egyptologist and historian (born 1955)

Karl Jansen-Winkeln (born 3 April 1955 in Mönchengladbach) is a German Egyptologist and historian.

== Academic work ==
Karl Jansen-Winkeln received his doctorate in Egyptology at the University of Bonn in 1983. He received his habilitation in 1990 with his thesis Text und Sprache in der 3. Zwischenzeit. Vorarbeiten zu einer spätmittelägyptischen Grammatik at the Free University of Berlin. He taught there as a lecturer and, since 2002, as professor. His work has focused on the Egyptian language, inscriptions, chronology, and prosopography. Among his most notable publications are Ägyptischen Biographien der 22. und 23. Dynastie (1985), Spätmittelägyptische Grammatik (1996), and Inschriften der Spätzeit, a series of edited primary sources from the Third Intermediate Period and later. Jansen-Winkeln's studies on the end of the New Kingdom and the Third Intermediate Period have had a significant impact on the historiography of Ancient Egypt, for example identifying the previously elusive burial and throne name of Takelot I and in contributing to a new understanding of the order and political role of the High Priests of Amun Piankh and Herihor. As a specialist on the subject, Jansen-Winkeln wrote the sections on the Egyptian chronology of the Third Intermediate Period in the Brill handbook of Ancient Egyptian Chronology (2006). By 2020, Jansen-Winkeln's publications included nine monographs, 245 articles, and 26 reviews. Karl Jansen-Winkeln has served as an editor for the scholarly journals Altorientalische Forschungen (from 1996 to 2012) and Journal of Egyptian History (since 2006).

== Select Publications of Karl Jansen-Winkeln ==
=== Monographs ===
- Ägyptische Biographien der 22. und 23. Dynastie (= Ägypten und Altes Testament 8), 1/2, Wiesbaden, 1985.
- Text und Sprache in der 3. Zwischenzeit. Vorarbeiten zu einer Grammatik des Mittelägyptischen der Spätzeit (= Ägypten und Altes Testament 26), Wiesbaden, 1994.
- Spätmittelägyptische Grammatik (= Ägypten und Altes Testament 34), Wiesbaden, 1996.
- Sentenzen und Maximen in der Privatinschriften der ägyptischen Spätzit, Berlin, 1999.
- Biographische und religiöse Inschriften der Spätzeit aus dem Ägyptischen Museum Kairo (= Ägypten und Altes Testament 45), 1/2, Wiesbaden, 2001.
- Inschriften der Spätzeit, Teil I: Die 21. Dynastie, Wiesbaden, 2007.
- Inschriften der Spätzeit, Teil II: Die 22-24. Dynastie, Wiesbaden, 2007.
- Inschriften der Spätzeit, Teil III: Die 25. Dynastie, Wiesbaden, 2009.
- Inschriften der Spätzeit, Teil IV: Die 26. Dynastie, 1/2, Wiesbaden, 2014.

=== Articles ===
- "Imperativ oder Passiv: Noch einmal zur 'Saitischen Formel'," Studien zur Altägyptischen Kultur 49 (2020) 73-92.
- "Zwei Kanopensätze aus der Nenbeteru-Familie mit ungewöhnlichen Texten," Göttinger Miszellen 259 (2019) 113-131.
- "Psametik I., die Skyten und der Untergang des Assyrerreiches," Orientalia 88 (2019) 238-266.
- "Ein Wezir als Priester," in: M. Brose (ed.), En Détail — Philologie und Archäologie im Diskurs: Festschrift für Hans-Werner Fischer-Elfert, Berlin, 2019: 461-482.
- "Der Titel zmȝ(tj) Wȝst(j) und die Propheten des Month in Theben," Studien zur Altägyptischen Kultur 47 (2018) 121-135.
- "Eine Schwester Psametiks I. in Theben," Orientalia 87 (2018) 221-226.
- "Beiträge zur Geschichte der Dritten Zwischenzeit," Journal of Egyptian History 10 (2017) 23-42.
- "Beiträge zur Geschichte der 21. Dynastie," Journal of Egyptian Archaeology 102 (2016) 73-96.
- "Zur Chronologie der späten 20. Dynastie," Göttinger Miszellen 249 (2016) 67-84.
- "EGYPT AND NORTH AFRICA: CULTURAL CONTACTS (1200-750 BC)" in Andrea Babbi, Friederike Bubenheimer-Erhart, Beatriz Marín-Aguilera, Simone Mühl (Hg.), The Mediterranean Mirror. Cultural Contacts in the Mediterranean Sea between 1200 and 750 B.C, RGZM – Tagungen 20, Mainz 2015, 35-50
- "'Don't do what I did!' An Early Middle Kingdom Block Statue," Zeitschrift für Ägyptische Sprache und Altertumskunde 142 (2015) 33-44 (with B. Fay and R. Parkinson).
- "Die 'Großfürsten der Libu' im westlichen Delta in der späten 22. Dynastie," Journal of Egyptian History 7 (2014) 194-202.
- "Die Siegesstele des Amasis," Zeitschrift für Ägyptische Sprache und Altertumskunde 141 (2014) 132-153.
- "Die Stiftung von Pritavtstatuen mit Königsnamen in der 26. Dynastie," Göttinger Miszellen 231 (2011) 57-64.
- "Der Untergang des Alten Reiches (The Fall of the Old Kingdom)," Orientalia 79 (2010) 273-303.
- "Drei Statuen der 22./23. Dynastie," Zeitschrift für Ägyptische Sprache und Altertumskunde 135 (2008) 50-62.
- "Zu den biographischen Inschriften der 25. und 26. Dynastie," Welt des Orients 38 (2008) 157-175.
- "Zur historischen Authentizität ägyptischer und biblischer Quellen: Die Palästinafeldzug Schoschenks I.," Orientalische Literaturzeitung 103 (2008) 165-173.
- "Drei Statueninschriften einer Familie aus frühptolemäischer Zeit," Studien zur Altägyptischen Kultur 36 (2007) 49-79.
- "Eine 'neue' ramessidische Biographie," Zeitschrift für Ägyptische Sprache und Altertumskunde 134 (2007) 107-115, pl. 5-20.
- "The Relevance of Genealogical Information for Egyptian Chronology," Ägypten und Levante 16 (2007) 257-273.
- "Zu zwei Personen der frühen Dritten Zwischenzeit," Studien zur Altägyptischen Kultur 35 (2006) 125-140, pl. 7-11.
- "Die Libyer in Herakleopolis magna," Orientalia 75 (2006) 297-316, pl. 31-36.
- "Relative Chronology of Dyn. 21," in: Hornung et al. 2006: 218-233.
- "The Chronology of the Third Intermediate Period: Dyn. 22–24," in: Hornung et al. 2006: 234-264.
- "Thebanische Statuen der 25. und 26. Dynastie," Studien zur Altägyptischen Kultur 34 (2006) 217-240, pl. 9-19.
- "Der Prinz und Hohenpriester Schoschenk D," Göttinger Miszellen 207 (2005) 75-80.
- "Die Entwicklung der genealogischen Informationen nach dem Neuen Reich," in: M. Fitzenreiter (ed.), Genealogie - Realität und Fiktion von Identität, London, 2005: 137-145.
- "Ein Priester als Restaurator," Zeitschrift für Ägyptische Sprache und Altertumskunde 132 (2005) 35-40, pl. 15-16.
- "Vier Denkmäler einer thebanischen Offiziersfamilie der 22. Dynastie," Studien zur Altägyptischen Kultur 33 (2005) 125-146, pl. 6-11.
- "Bemerkungen zu den Frauenbibliographien der Spätzeit," Altorientalische Forschungen 31 (2004) 357-373.
- "Lebenslehre und Biographie," Zeitschrift für Ägyptische Sprache und Altertumskunde 131 (2004) 59-72.
- "Zu einer Sekundärbestattung der 21. Dynastie in Kom Ombo," Göttinger Miszellen 202 (2004) 71-78.
- "Zu einigen Inschriften der Dritten Zwischenzeit," Revue d'Égyptologie 55 (2004) 45-79.
- "Zwei Statuen der Spätzeit aus der Cachette von Karnak", Mitteilungen des Deutschen Archäologischen Instituts, Abteilung Kairo 60, 2004, pp.93-105
- "Alara und Taharka: zur Geschichte des nubischen Königshauses," Orientalia 72 (2003) 141-158.
- "Zu einer Genealogie aus der frühen 22. Dynastie," Studien zur Altägyptischen Kultur 31 (2003) 211-223, pl. 10-17.
- "Ägyptische Genealogien der Dritten Zwischenzeit," in: P. van der Veen and U. Zerbst (eds.), Biblische Archäologie am Scheideweg?, Holzgerlingen, 2002: 99-103.
- "Die Quellen zur Eroberung Ägyptens durch Kambyses," in: T. Bács (ed.), A Tribute to Excellence: Studies offered in Honor of Ernö Gaál, Ulrich Luft, László Török = Studia Aegyptiaca 17 (2002): 309-319.
- "Bild und Charakter der ägyptischen 26. Dynastie," Altorientalische Forschungen 28 (2001) 165-182.
- "Der Schlußsatz der Biographie des Chnumhotep in Beni Hassan," Göttinger Miszellen 180 (2001) 77-80.
- "Der thebanische 'Gottesstaat'," Orientalia 70 (2001) 153-182.
- "Bemerkungen zum 'Genetiv' im Ägyptischen," Zeitschrift für Ägyptische Sprache und Altertumskunde 127 (2000) 27-37.
- "Die Fremdherrschaften in Ägypten im 1. Jahrtausend v. Chr.," Orientalia 69 (2000) 1-20.
- "Zum Verständnis der 'Saitischen Formel'," Studien zur Altägyptischen Kultur 28 (2000) 83-124.
- "Zur Geschichte der Cachette von Deir el-Bahari," in: R. J. Demarée and A. Egberts (eds.), Deir el-Medina in the Third Millennium AD: A Tribute to Jac. Janssen, Leiden, 2000.
- "Dating the Beginning of the 22nd Dynasty," Journal of the Ancient Chronology Forum 8 (1999) 17-21.
- "Die Wahl des Königs durch Orakel in der 20. Dynastie," BSEG 23 (1999) 51-61.
- "Ein Amunpriester in Memphis," Studien zur Altägyptischen Kultur 27 (1999) 123-139, pl. 1-4.
- "Gab es in der altägyptischen Geschichte eine feudalistische Epoche?" Welt des Orients 30 (1999) 7-20.
- "Beiträge zu den Privatinschriften der Spätzeit," Zeitschrift für Ägyptische Sprache und Altertumskunde 125 (1998) 1-13.
- "Drei Denkmäler mit archaisierender Orthographie," Orientalia 67 (1998) 155-172, pl. 8-10.
- "Die thebanischen Gründer der 21. Dynastie," Göttinger Miszellen 157 (1997) 49-74.
- "Zu den Koregenzen der 12. Dynastie," Studien zur Altägyptischen Kultur 24 (1997) 115-135.
- "Die Plünderung der Königsgräber des Neuen Reiches," Zeitschrift für Ägyptische Sprache und Altertumskunde 122 (1995) 62-78.
- "Historische Probleme der 3. Zwischenzeit," Journal of Egyptian Archaeology 81 (1995) 129-149, pl. 11-13.
- "Neue biographische Texte der 22./23. Dynastie," Studien zur Altägyptischen Kultur 22 (1995) 169-194, pl. 3-9.
- "Der Beginn der libyschen Herrschaft in Ägypten," BN 71 (1994) 78-97.
- "Der Schriber Butehamun," Göttinger Miszellen 139 (1994) 35-40.
- "The Career of the Egyptian High Priest Bakenkhons," Journal of Near Eastern Studies 52 (1993) 221-225.
- "Das Ende des Neuen Reiches," Zeitschrift für Ägyptische Sprache und Altertumskunde 119 (1992) 22-37.
- "Ein Würfelhocker des Amunpropheten Djedbastetiufanch (Kairo JE 37597)", Mitteilungen des Deutschen Archäologischen Instituts, Abteilung Kairo 48, 1992, pp.57-64
- "Das Attentat auf Amenemhet I. und die ägyptische Koregentschaft," Studien zur Altägyptischen Kultur 18 (1991) 241-264.
- "Zur Schreibung des Pseudopartizips in den Pyramidentexten", Bulletin de la Société d’Egyptologie Genève 15, 1991, pp.43-56
- "Vermerke. Zum Verständnis kurzer und formelhafter Inschriften auf ägyptischen Denkmälern", Mitteilungen des Deutschen Archäologischen Instituts, Abteilung Kairo 46 1990, pp.127-156
- "Zu den biographischen Texten der 3. Zwischenzeit," Göttinger Miszellen 117/118 (1990) 165-180.
- "Weiters zum Grab Osorkons II.," Göttinger Miszellen 102 (1988) 31-39.
- "Thronname und Begräbnis Takeloths I.," Varia Aegyptiaca 3 (1987) 253-258.
- "Zum militärischen Befehlsbereich der Hohenpriester des Amun," Göttinger Miszellen 99 (1987) 19-22.
- "Die Haut der Menschen (zu UC 14333, Z.13)," Varia Aegyptiaca 1 (1985) 107.

== Bibliography ==
- Hornung, Erik, Rolf Krauss and David Warburton (eds.) 2006, Handbook of Ancient Egyptian Chronology, Leiden: Brill.
- Hsu, Shih-Wei, Vincent Pierre-Michel Laisney, and Jan Moje (eds.) 2020, Ein Kundiger, der in die Gottesworte eingedrungen ist: Festschrift für den Ägyptologen Karl Jansen-Winkeln zum 65. Geburtstag (= Ägypten und Altes Testament 99), Münster: Zaphon.
- Jansen-Winkeln, Karl 1987, "Thronname und Begräbnis Takeloths I.," Varia Aegyptiaca 3: 253-258.
- Jansen-Winkeln, Karl 1992, "Das Ende des Neuen Reiches," Zeitschrift für Ägyptische Sprache und Altertumskunde 119: 22-37.
- Kitchen, Kenneth A. 1996, The Third Intermediate Period in Egypt (1100–650 BC), 3rd ed., Warminster: Aris & Phillips.
