= Maatkare B =

Maatkare
- Queen consort of Egypt
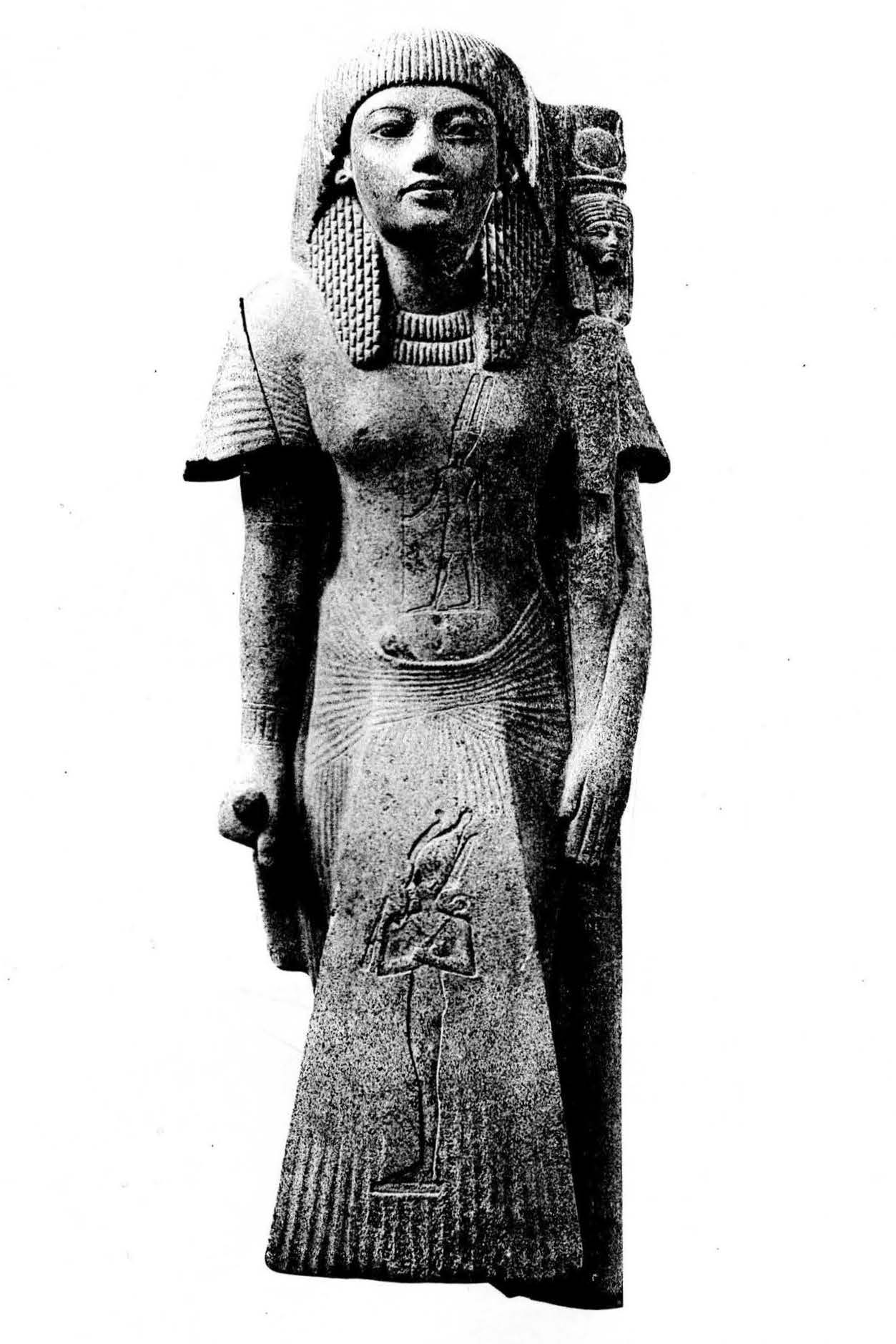
- Statue of the High Priest of Amun Shoshenq, mentioning his parents Osorkon I and Maatkare. Cairo, CG 42194
- Spouse: Osorkon I
- Issue: Shoshenq Q
- Dynasty: 22nd Dynasty
- Father: Psusennes II

N5 C10 D28
Maatkare
in hieroglyphs
Era: 3rd Intermediate Period
(1069–664 BC)

Maatkare, designated Maatkare B, was a wife of Pharaoh Osorkon I and the mother of the High Priest of Amun Shoshenq Q.

== Family ==
Maatkare was the king's daughter of Psusennes II (also known as Pasebkhanut II).

== Attestations ==
Maatkare is known from several sources. Her statuette, of which only the base with a pair of feet is preserved (Marseille, Musée Borély no. 432) may be a re-used New Kingdom piece.

A statue of the Nile-god - now in the British Museum (BM 8) - was dedicated by her son Shoshenq, and he lists his parents as Osorkon I and Maatkare. Maatkare is called the King's Daughter of ... Har-Psusennes II, beloved of Amun.

On a statue from the Karnak Cachette (Cairo Museum CG 42194), also dedicated by her son Shoshenq, Maatkare has the titles Prophetess of Hathor, Lady of Dendera, God's Mother of Harsomtus, and King's Daughter.

A Karnak inscription on the seventh pylon names a woman called Maatkare, King's Daughter of Psusennes Beloved of Amun, and this is usually thought to refer to Maatkare B.
