= Psusennes II =

Last king of the 21st Dynasty of Egypt

- Pasebakhaenniut II
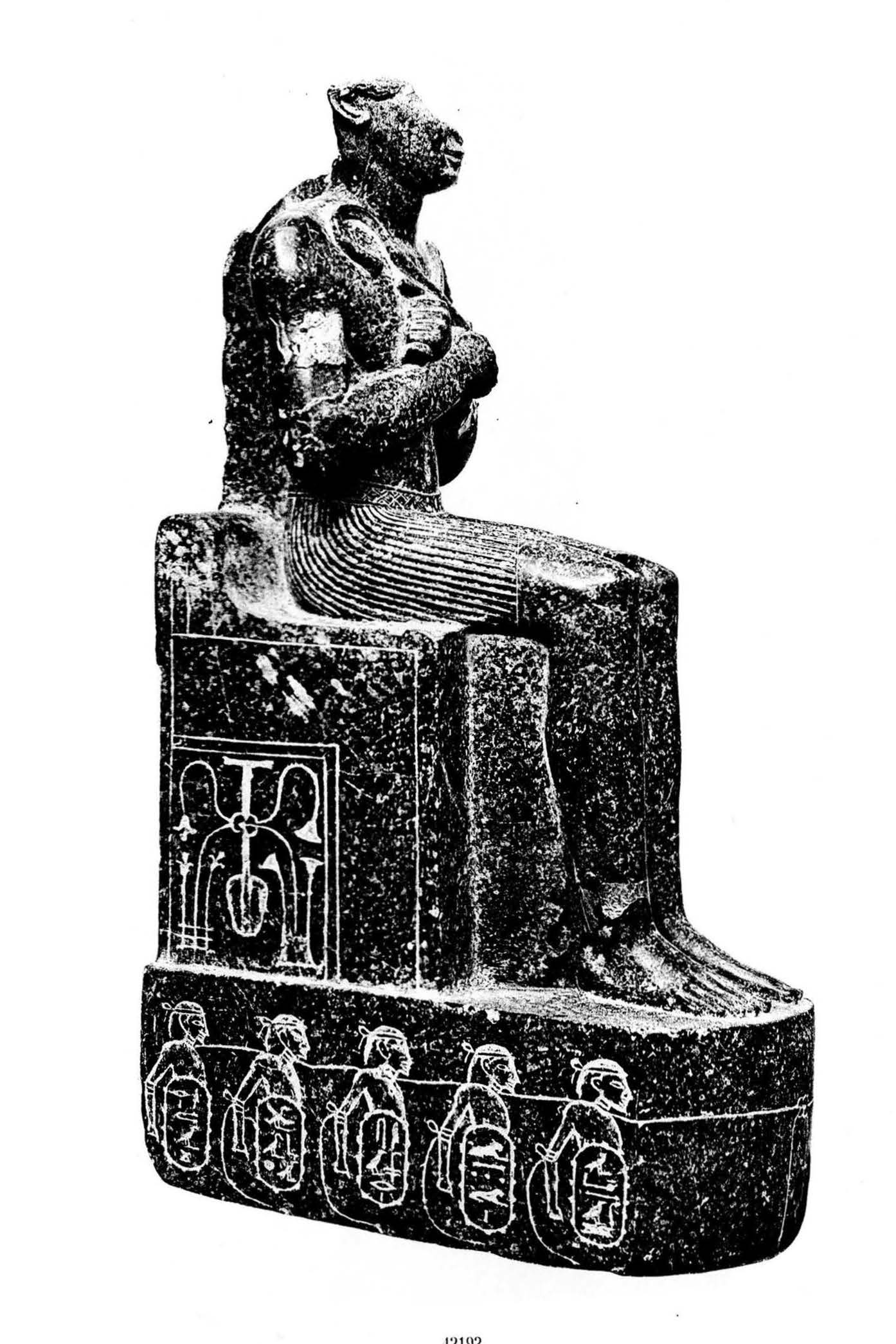
- Statue with dedication to Psusennes II and Shoshenq I (originally for Thutmose III). Cairo, CG 42192 (JE 37005)

Pharaoh
- Reign: 966 – 943 BC
- Predecessor: Siamun
- Successor: Shoshenq I
Royal titulary
Prenomen
Titkheperure Setepenre
Tjt-ḫprw-Rˁ-stp-n-Rˁ
Image of the transformations of Ra, the chosen one of Ra
M23 t L2 t < ra D17 xpr Z3 ra stp n >
Nomen
Hor Pasebakhaenniut
Ḥr-pȝ-sbȝ-ḫˁj-n-njwt
Psusennes, litt. Horus, the star who appears in the city [of Thebes]
G39 N5 < G5 G40 N14 N28 N35 O49 >
Variant:
Hor Pasebakhaenniut Meriamun
Ḥr-p3-sb3-ḫˁj-n-njwt-mrj-Jmn
Psusennes, litt. Horus, the star who appears
in the city [of Thebes], beloved of Amun
G39 N5 < M17 Y5 N35 N36 G5 Q3 N14 X1 N28 O49 >
- Children: Maatkare B, Tentsepeh B (wife of Shedsu-nefertum)
- Father: Pinedjem II
- Mother: Isetemkheb D
- Died: 943 BC
- Burial: Unknown, possibly reburied in NRT III at Tanis
- Dynasty: 21st Dynasty

Psusennes II (Greek: Ψουσέννης; Egyptian Pȝ-sbȝ-ḫˁỉ-n-nỉwt Pasebakhaennuit), Throne Name Titkheperure, was the last king of the Twenty-first Dynasty of Egypt.

== Early life ==
=== Family ===
Psusennes II (identical with Psusennes III) was the son of High Priest of Amun, Pinedjem II, and born to Istemkheb D. His parents were siblings, children of High Priest of Amun, Menkheperre, son of Pinedjem I and born to Duathathor-Henuttawy, daughter of Ramesses XI and born to Tentamon of the previous 20th dynasty. King Psusennes I was also a son of Pinedjem I and Henuttawy.

He married [...], daughter of [...] and born to [...]. His daughter Maatkare B was the Great Royal Wife of Osorkon I of the next 22nd dynasty. Another daughter may have been Tentsepeh B who became the wife of High Priest of Ptah, Shedsu-nefertum.

=== Career ===
In Year 10 of Siamun, Pinedjem II died and was succeeded by Psusennes III (thought to be identical with Psusennes II). At Thebes, he succeeded his father as High Priest of Amun becoming the de facto ruler of Upper Egypt.

== Reign ==
=== Accession ===
In the order of succession, Psusennes II was neither a son of Psusennes I or Siamun. Instead he succeeded his cousin Siamun under uncertain circumstances.

His royal name means "Image of the transformations of Re" in Egyptian. Psusennes II is often considered the same person as the High-Priest of Amun known as Psusennes III. The Egyptologist Karl Jansen-Winkeln notes that an important graffito from the Temple of Abydos contains the complete titles of a king Tyetkheperre Setepenre Pasebakhaenniut Meryamun "who is simultaneously called the HPA (i.e., High Priest of Amun) and supreme military commander." This suggests that Psusennes was both king at Tanis and the High Priest in Thebes at the same time, meaning he did not resign his office as High Priest of Amun during his reign. The few contemporary attestations from his reign include the aforementioned graffito in Seti I's Abydos temple, an ostracon from Umm el-Qa'ab, an affiliation at Karnak and his presumed burial – which consists of a gilded coffin with a royal uraeus and a mummy, found in an antechamber of Psusennes I's tomb at Tanis.

=== Reign length ===
Items which can be added to the list of secure attestations of Psusennes II include a Year 5 Mummy linen that was written with the High Priest Psusennes III's name. It is generally assumed that a Year 13 III Peret 10+X date in fragment 3B, line 6 of the Karnak Priestly Annals belongs to his reign. Unfortunately, however, the king's name is not stated and the only thing which is certain is that the fragment must be dated after Siamun's reign whose Year 17 is mentioned in lines 3–5. Hence, it belongs to either Psusennes II or possibly Shoshenq I's reign.

Recently, the first conclusive date for king Psusennes II was revealed in a newly published priestly annal stone block. This document, which has been designated as 'Block Karnak 94, CL 2149,' records the induction of a priest named Nesankhefenmaat into the chapel of Amun-Re within the Karnak precinct in Year 11 the first month of Shemu day 13 of a king named Psusennes according to Frederic Payraudeau. The preceding line of this document recorded the induction of Nesankhefenmaat's father, a certain Nesamun, into the priesthood of Amun-Re in king Siamun's reign. Siamun was the predecessor of Psusennes II at Tanis. The identification of the aforementioned Psusennes with Psusennes II is certain since the same fragmentary annal document next records—in the following line—the induction of Hor, the son of Nesankhefenmaat, into the priesthood of the chapel of Amun-Re at Karnak in Year 3 the second month of Akhet day 14 of king Osorkon I's reign just one generation later.—with Shoshenq I's 21-year reign being skipped over. This would not be unexpected since most Egyptologists believe that a generation in Egyptian society lasted a minimum of 25 years and a maximum of 30 years. Therefore, the Year 11 date can only be assigned to Psusennes II and constitutes the first securely attested date for this pharaoh's reign.

The British Egyptologist Aidan Dodson also accepts this new evidence from Frederic Payraudeau's discovery of this new unknown fragment of the Karnak priestly annals and has now discarded his previously published the late 1980s theory that Psusennes II's reign lay entirely within the reign of Shoshenq I. Dodson notes the recently found annal block document establishes that Psusennes II "was indeed a 'real' king, with a reign that was recognized at Thebes." Dodson also writes that Psusennes II's royal status was confirmed when Jean Yoyotte realized "that a batch of crude faience shabtis bearing the name of a [king] Pasebkhanut (i.e., Psusennes) found in the antechamber of Tanis [Tomb] NRT-III did not belong to the tomb's original owner, Pasebkhanut I, as had originally been assumed, but to the later king of the [same] name." This means that Psusennes II's long-decayed coffin and mummy is located in the debris of this antechamber of Psusennes I's Tanis tomb where Heqakheperre Shoshenq II's coffin and mummy mask was also discovered.

Unlike his immediate predecessor and successor – Siamun and Shoshenq I respectively– Psusennes II is generally less well attested in contemporary historical records even though various versions of Manetho's Epitome credit him with either a 14- or a 35-year reign (generally amended to 15 years by most scholars including the British Egyptologist Kenneth Kitchen).

The German scholar Rolf Krauss has recently argued that Psusennes II's reign was 24 years rather than Manetho's original figure of 14 years. This is based on personal information recorded in the Large Dakhla stela which dates to Year 5 of Shoshenq I; the stela preserves a reference to a land-register from Year 19 of a 'Pharaoh Psusennes'. However, since this document was composed under Shoshenq I, the use of the title Pharaoh before Psusennes here cannot establish whether the king was Psusennes I. The use of Pharaoh as title (as in Pharaoh Shoshenq or Pharaoh Psusennes I) is first attested in the historical records under Siamun.

Moreover, Frederic Payraudeau has observed—in his BIFAO 108 paper which first document the first secure attestation of Psusennes II in the historical record—that the annal document is a genealogical document recording the induction of Nesankhefenmaat into the chapel of Amun-Re in Year 11 of Psusennes II followed by Hor, Nesankhefenmaat's son, in Year 3 of Osorkon II. Since a generation was close to 25 to 30 years in Ancient Egypt and the 21-year reign of Shoshenq I—the successor of Psusennes II and predecessor of Osorkon II—was already skipped over, this strongly suggests that Psusennes II's reign was much closer to 14 years rather than 24 years for a father (Nesankhefenmaat) to be succeeded by his son (Hor) within a short 25-30 year period argues Payraudeau.

In Year 5 of Shoshenq I, this king and the founder of the 22nd Dynasty, dispatched a certain Ma (i.e., Libyan) subordinate named Wayheset to the desert oasis town of Dakhla in order to restore Shoshenq I's authority over the western oasis region of Upper Egypt. Wayheset's titles include Prince and Governor of the Oasis. His activities are recorded in the Large Dakhla stela. This stela states that Wayheset adjudicated in a certain water dispute by consulting a land-register which is explicitly dated to Year 19 of a "Pharaoh Psusennes" in order to determine the water rights of a man named Nysu-Bastet. Kitchen notes that this individual made an appeal to the Year 19 cadastral land-register of king Psusennes belonging to his mother, which historians assumed was made some "80 years" before during the reign of Psusennes I. The land register recorded that certain water rights were formerly owned by Nysu-Bastet's mother Tewhunet in Year 19 of a king Psusennes. This ruler was generally assumed by Egyptologists to be Psusennes I rather than Psusennes II since the latter's reign was believed to have lasted only 14–15 years. Based on the land register evidence, Wayheset ordered that these watering rights should now be granted to Nysu-Bastet himself. However, if the oracle dated to Year 19 of Psusennes I as many scholars traditionally assumed, Nysu-Bastet would have been separated from his mother by a total of 80 years from this date into Year 5 of Shoshenq I—a figure which is highly unlikely since Nysu-Bastet would not have waited until extreme old age to uphold his mother's watering rights. This implies that the aforementioned king Psusennes here must be identified with Psusennes II instead—Shoshenq I's immediate predecessor and, more significantly, that Psusennes II enjoyed a minimum reign of 19 years.

The term "mother" in ancient Egypt could also be an allusion to an ancestress, the matriarch of a lineage whereby Nysu-Bastet may have been petitioning for his hereditary water rights that belonged to his grandmother, whose family name was Tewhunet. However, this argument does not account for the use of Pharaoh as a title in the Dakhla stela—a literary device which first occurs late during the reign of Siamun, an Egyptian king who ruled between 45 and 64 years after Year 19 of Psusennes I.

The most significant component of the Great Dakhla stela is its palaeography: the use of the title Pharaoh Psusennes. An Egyptologist named Helen Jacquet-Gordon believed in the 1970s that the large Dakhla stela belonged to Shoshenq III's reign due to its use of the title 'Pharaoh' directly with the ruling king's birth name—i.e., "Pharaoh Shoshenq"—which was an important palaeographical development in Egyptian history. Throughout the Old, Middle and New Kingdoms of Ancient Egypt, the word pharaoh was never employed as a title such as Mr. and Mrs. or attached to a king's nomen such as Pharaoh Ramesses or Pharaoh Amenhotep; instead, the word 'pr-`3' or pharaoh was used as a noun to refer to the activities of the king (i.e., it was "Pharaoh" who ordered the creation of a temple or statue, or the digging of a well, etc.). Rolf Krauss aptly observes that the earliest attested use of the word pharaoh as a title is documented in Year 17 of the 21st Dynasty king Siamun from Karnak Priestly Annals fragment 3B while a second use of the title [Pharaoh] [birth name] occurs during Psusennes II's reign where a hieratic graffito in the Ptah chapel of the Abydos temple of Seti I explicitly refers to Psusennes II as the "High Priest of Amen-Re, King of the Gods, the Leader, Pharaoh Psusennes." Consequently, the practice of attaching the title pr-`3 or pharaoh with a king's royal birth name had already started prior to the beginning of Shoshenq I's reign, let alone Shoshenq III. Hence, the Shoshenq mentioned in the large Year 5 Dakhla stela must have been Shoshenq I while the Psusennes mentioned in the same document likewise can only be Psusennes II which means that only 5 years (or 10 years if Psusennes II ruled Egypt for 24 years) would separate Nysu-Bastet from his mother. The additional fact that the Large Dakhla stela contains a Year 5 IV Peret day 25 lunar date has helped date the aforementioned king Shoshenq's accession to 943 BC and demonstrates that the ruler here must be Shoshenq I, not Shoshenq III who ruled a century later. Helen Jacquet-Gordon did not know of the two prior examples pertaining to Siamun and Psusennes II.

=== Timeline ===
The editors of the 'Handbook on Ancient Egyptian Chronology' (2006)--Erik Hornung, Rolf Krauss and David Warburton—accept this logical reasoning and have amended Manetho's original figure of 14 years for Psusennes II to 24 years for Psusennes II. This is not unprecedented since Egyptologists had previously amended the reign of Siamun by a decade from 9 years—as preserved in surviving copies of Manetho's Epitome—to 19 years based on certain Year 16 and Year 17 dates attested for the latter. Psusennes II ruled Egypt for a minimum of 19 years based on the internal chronology of the Large Dakhla stela. However, a calculation of a lunar Tepi Shemu feast which records the induction of Hori son of Nespaneferhor into the Amun priesthood in regnal year 17 of Siamun, Psusennes II's predecessor—demonstrates that this date was equivalent to 970 BC. Since Siamun enjoyed a reign of 19 years, he would have died 2 years later in 968/967 BC and been succeeded by Psusennes II by 967 BC at the latest. Consequently, a reign of 24 years or 967-943 BC is now likely for Psusennes II; hence, his reign has been raised from 14 to 24 years.

=== Succession ===
Psusennes II's royal name has been found associated with his successor, Shoshenq I in a graffito from tomb TT18, and in an ostracon from Umm el-Qa'ab.

A statue of Thutmose III (Cairo CG 42192) which contains two parallel columns of texts – one referring to Psusennes II and the other to Shoshenq I – a recently unearthed block from Tell Basta which preserves the nomen of Shoshenq I together with the prenomen of Psusennes II, and a now lost graffito from Theban Tomb 18.

== Death ==
=== Tomb ===
Although Psusennes II's original royal tomb has never been located, it has been proposed that he is one of "two completely decayed mummies in the antechamber of NRT-III (Psusennes I's tomb)" on the basis of ushabtis found on them which bore this king's name. Psusennes II's original tomb may have been inundated by the Nile which compelled a reburial of this king in Psusennes I's tomb.
