= Twenty-first Dynasty of Egypt =

Ancient Egyptian dynasty

- 1077 BC–943 BC
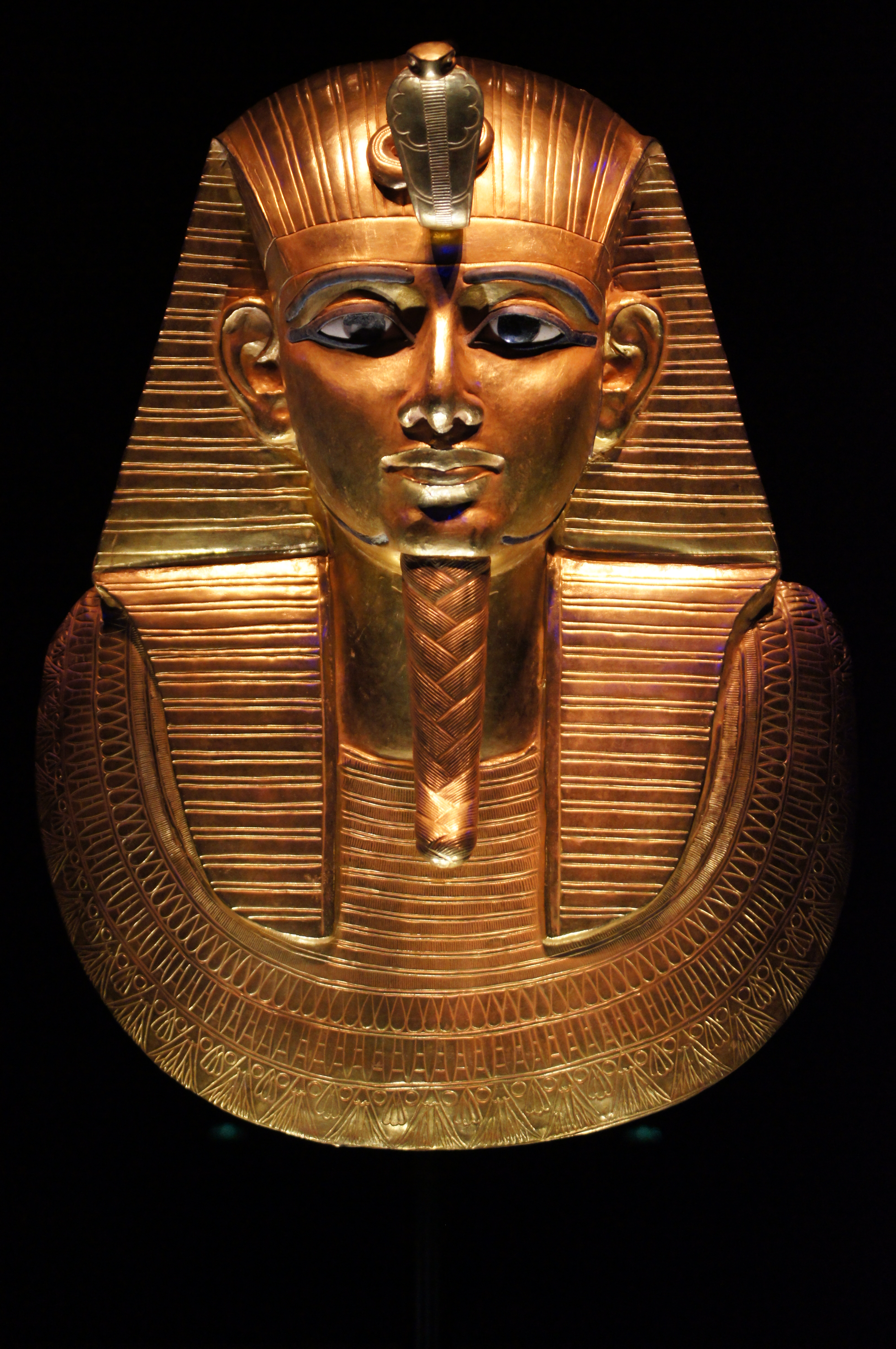
- Gold funerary mask of pharaoh Psusennes I
- Capital: Tanis
- Common languages: Egyptian language
- Religion: Ancient Egyptian Religion
- Government: Absolute monarchy
- Historical era: Third Intermediate Period of Egypt
  - Established: 1077 BC
  - Disestablished: 943 BC
Preceded by	Succeeded by
Twentieth Dynasty of Egypt	Twenty-second Dynasty of Egypt

The Twenty-first Dynasty of Egypt (notated Dynasty XXI, alternatively 21st Dynasty or Dynasty 21) is usually classified as the first Dynasty of the Ancient Egyptian Third Intermediate Period, lasting from 1077 BC to 943 BC.

== History ==
After the reign of Ramesses III, a long, slow decline of royal power in Egypt followed. The pharaohs of the Twenty-first Dynasty ruled from Tanis, but were mostly active only in Lower Egypt, which they controlled. This dynasty is described as 'Tanite' because its political capital was based at Tanis. Meanwhile, the High Priests of Amun at Thebes effectively ruled Middle and Upper Egypt in all but name. The later Egyptian Priest Manetho of Sebennytos states in his Epitome on Egyptian royal history that "the 21st Dynasty of Egypt lasted for 130 years".

== Pharaohs of the 21st Dynasty ==
Dynasty XXI Kings of Egypt
Pharaoh	Image	Prenomen (Throne name)	Horus-name	Reign	Burial	Consort(s)	Comments
Smendes / Nesbanebdjed I		Hedjkheperre Setepenre	Kanakhtmeryreseuser Amunkhepesheferseqamaat	1077 - 1051 BC	unknown	Tentamun	Only controlled Lower Egypt during his reign. Founder of the 21st Dynasty.
Amenemnisu		Neferkare Heqawaset	(unknown)	1051 - 1047 BC	unknown		
Psusennes I / Hor-Pasebakhaenniut I		Akheperre Setepenamun	Kanakhtemdedamun Userfausekhaemwaset	1047 - 998 BC	NRT III, Tanis	Mutnedjemet; Wiay	Precise length of reign unknown. Either 49 years or maximum 50 years.
Amenemope		Usermaatre Setepenamun	(unknown)	1000 - 991 BC	Tanis		Manetho writes in his Epitome that Amenemope ruled Egypt for 9 years with first 2-3 years in co-regency with Psusennes I.
Osorkon the Elder		Akheperre Setepenre	(unknown)	991 - 985 BC	unknown		Osorkon the elder ruled Egypt for 6 years.
Siamun		Netjerkheperre Setepenamun	Kanakhtmerymat Sameryenamunperemhauef	985 - 966 BC	unknown		Siamun is believed to have ruled Egypt for 19 years. Egyptologists have amended Manetho's figure of 9 years for this king to [1]9 years based on a Year 17 known for him in the Karnak Priestly Annals
Psusennes II / Hor-Pasebakhaenniut II		Titkheperure Setepenre	(unknown)	966 - 943 BC	unknown		

== See also ==
- Family tree of the Twenty-first, Twenty-second, and Twenty-third Dynasties of Egypt
- Theban High Priests of Amun

Preceded by Twentieth Dynasty	Dynasties of Egypt c. 1077 BC–943 BC	Succeeded by Twenty-second Dynasty
