= Battle of Perire =

Ancient Egyptian battle

Date	c. 1208 BC
Location	Perire, possibly in the western Nile Delta
Result	Egyptian victory

Belligerents
New Kingdom of Egypt	Libyan coalition Sea Peoples

Commanders and leaders
Merneptah	Meryey

Strength
Unknown	Unknown

Casualties and losses
Unknown	8,000+ killed, 9,000 captured (Egyptian claim)

The Battle of Perire was fought around 1208 BC between the New Kingdom of Egypt, led by the pharaoh Merneptah, and a coalition of Libyan tribes and Sea Peoples. The Egyptians won a decisive victory. This was the first of many encounters between Egypt and the Sea Peoples. The main source of information about this battle is the Great Karnak Inscription.

== Prelude ==
During the Old and Middle Kingdom of Egypt, Libya to the west was not a major security concern for the Egyptian pharaohs aside from occasional raiding warfare. The situation appears to have changed under the late Eighteenth Dynasty of Egypt, as the Egyptian military invested more resources in securing the western borders of Egypt. From the early Nineteenth Dynasty of Egypt, fortresses were built west of modern-day Alexandria to shield the Nile Delta from Libyan (Libu) incursions. However, at least one of these new bastions, Zawyet Umm El Rakham, was quickly abandoned. Egyptologist Ian Shaw argued that Zawyet Umm El Rakham's short existence suggests that the Libyan tribes increasingly pushed eastward, forcing the Egyptians to evacuate the fortress; this push ultimately culminated in the Libyan invasion during Merneptah's reign.

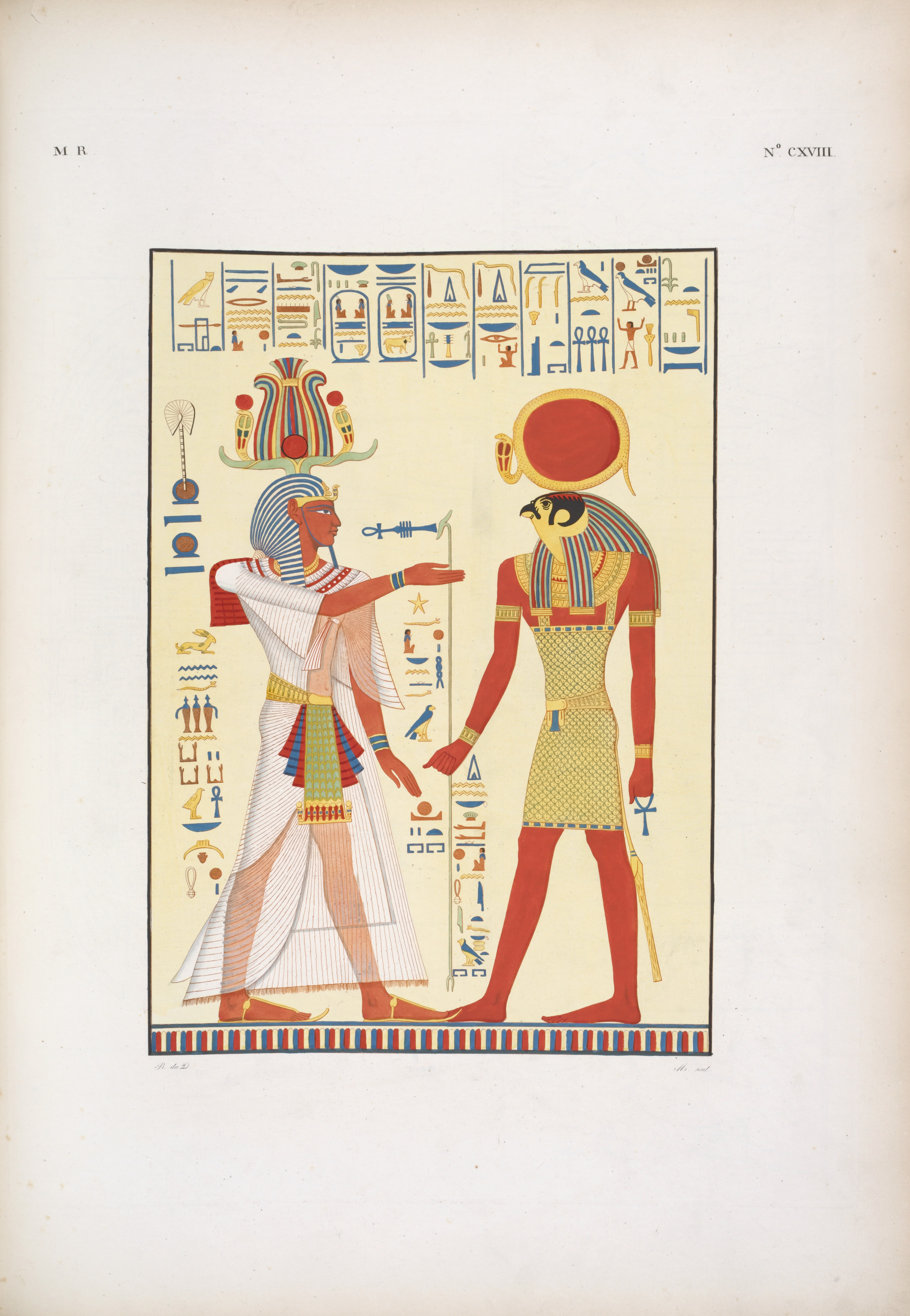
Painting of Merneptah (left) and Ra-Horakhty

In the late 13th century BC, a famine in Libya compelled many of the tribes in the region to unite under the leadership of a chief known as Meryey. The Libyan alliance included the Tjehenu and Meshwesh. Together these tribes prepared to invade Egypt. Their exact intentions are unclear but they most likely wished to conquer territory within the borders of Egypt, including Memphis. Meryey's coalition probably numbered tens of thousands; this force possibly included not just warriors but also their families and possessions such as cattle and portable wealth. However, the Egyptian plunder lists compiled after the Battle of Perire mention only the family of King Meryey, and no other women or children. This omission is notable, given that the Egyptian records describe the spoils in extensive detail, including even minor items such as arrowheads. Thus, historian Konstantinos Kopanias argued that the invading force consisted mainly of soldiers, rather than large groups of dependants. Furthermore, the Libyans allied with or hired a substantial contingent of Sea Peoples, including Shekelesh, Teresh, Ekwesh, Lukka, and Sherden; members of the last group also served in the Egyptian military. The Libyans possibly used their wealth, gained through control of trade from Central Africa to the Mediterranean Sea, to hire the Sea Peoples as mercenaries.

The Libyans first captured an oasis to the west of Egypt; modern researchers have speculated that this oasis may have been the Bahariya or Siwa Oasis. From there, the Libyan force advanced to Farafra. This was a strategically central location in the region, as holding Farafra allowed the Libyans to control the routes between the local oases, send messages to Nubia, and to strike at several parts of Egypt. According to Egyptologist Colleen Darnell, this showcases that Meryey was pursuing a grand strategy: As Farafra allowed them access to at least three invasion routes, the Libyans could surprise the Egyptians despite the latter's knowledge of their military preparations. In addition, Meryey possibly contacted Libo-Nubians south of Farafra and enlisted them in his plan. The latter is indicated by the Amada Stele, which records Nubian raids in Upper Egypt two days before the Battle of Perire. Darnell speculated that the contemporariness of the raids and battle hint at a wider alliance in which Meryey's Libyans and the Libo-Nubians cooperated to divide Egypt between them, with Meryey claiming the Nile Delta and the Libo-Nubians conquering the rich, Egyptian-held regions of Nubia.

After making their preparations, Meryey's Libyans moved from Farafra to Perire, most likely a city in the Nile Delta region. As a result of the scarcity of resources in the desert, the Libyans possibly split into a number of columns instead of operating as a single army. The Great Karnak Inscription poetically suggests that Meryey's main contingent advanced from Farafra to Bahariya, then into the Faiyum, before entering the delta around Memphis. Another Libyan column possibly crossed the Nile in Middle Egypt and then marched into the eastern delta, as the Karnak Inscription states that the Libyan vanguard camped at Perbarset in the east. Such an operation would have disrupted the Egyptian communications and supply routes, cutting off Memphis, Thebes, and Pi-Ramesses from each other. Finally, the inscription hints at another column marching along the Mediterranean coast, as several Egyptian fortresses are mentioned as being destroyed. Such bastions were mainly concentrated along the coast. The Libyan column were accompanied by their families and possessions, further strengthening the assumption that they intended to settle in conquered territories instead of just plundering them.

Meryey's army occupied parts of the western Nile Delta for about a month before the battle at Perire erupted.

== Battle ==
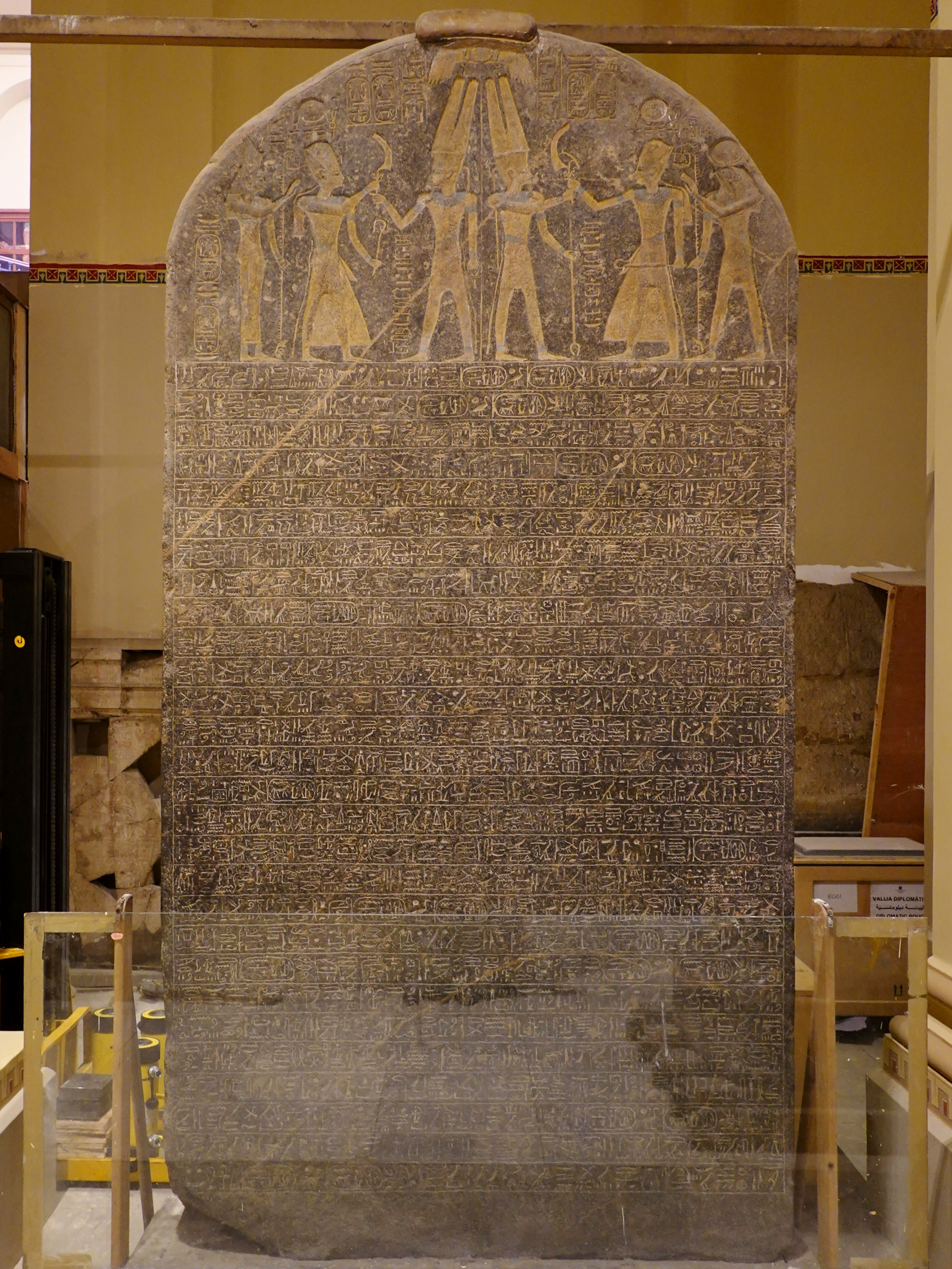
The Merneptah Stele, one of several texts celebrating the Egyptian victory at Perire

Meryey's operations ultimately culminated in a major confrontation at Perire on the third day of the third month of "Shomu", probably 1208 BC, though 1205 BC and 1207 BC have also been suggested. The Karnak Inscription gives few details on the battle, though some information can be gleaned from the source. The Egyptian army was composed of infantry and chariotry; the infantry included both archers as well as close-combat troops including Sherden warriors. The invaders' coalition was composed solely of infantry, with the Libyans operating as light infantry and the Sea Peoples providing heavy infantry.

According to the Karnak Inscription, the battle was divided into two phases: Initially, the Egyptian archers spent 6 hours attacking and factually breaking Meryey's army, before the Egyptian chariots charged in and pursued their fleeing opponents. Manassa speculated that the battle was opened by some skirmishing -possibly involving the mobile chariotry- before the Libyan-Sea People army charged to engage in close combat. As Merneptah knew that his frontline troops were probably inferior to Meryey's, the pharaoh had stationed his archers in a way to bombard the attackers whenever they came close. In this way, the Egyptians would have broken the invaders' charge(s). Despite the Egyptian strategy, the clash was tough and lengthy. Once the Libyan-Sea People army had suitably thinned or even collapsed, the Egyptian chariots and infantry advanced, causing a rout and winning the field.

The Egyptians gained a decisive victory over their opponents. The Karnak Inscription reported that Merneptah killed 6,000 Libyans, 2,201 Ekwesh, 722 Teresh, and 200 Shekelesh; furthermore, the Egyptians reportedly captured 9,000 enemies. However, Shaw argued that these numbers could not be "taken at face value", as Egyptian inscription records were prone to bombastic, exaggerated claims. Meryey fled the battlefield, with Merneptah mockingly declaring that his opponent had left "his bow and quiver and sandals on the ground behind him".

== Aftermath ==
Merneptah ordered many of the captured enemies to be impaled south of Memphis. This punishment was especially brutal and used rarely in Egyptian history, suggesting that the pharaoh hoped to send a strong message to any other potential Libyan invaders. Though the battle had succeeded in temporarily stemming the Libyan attacks, more invasions by Libyan tribes targeted Egypt under Ramesses III. Furthermore, the Sea Peoples grew into a bigger problem and ultimately contributed to the Late Bronze Age collapse. An especially large foreign invasion of Egypt took place around 1174 BC. Even though these Sea Peoples attacks were stopped at the twin battles of Djahy and the Delta by Ramesses III, Egypt subsequently declined.
