= Meryey =

Great Chief of the Libu
- Reign: Unknown
- Predecessor: Ded
- Successor: Meshken or Kepper ? Inamunnifnebu (indirectly)
- Born: c. 13th century BC
- Died: c. 13th century BC
- Issue: 6 unnamed sons
- Old Libyan: Meɣyey
- Father: Ded
- Religion: Libyan religion

Meryey, also written Meghiey or Meghyey (m-w-rꜣyꜣ-y; Numidian: Meɣyey) was a Berber king and Great Chief of the Libu during the late 13th century BC, contemporary with that of the ancient Egyptian pharaoh Merneptah (1213–1203 BC). Son of a man named Ded, Meryey is mentioned as the architect of a major military alliance amongst his nation, the Meshwesh, Lukka, and the Sea Peoples known as the Ekwesh, Teresh, Shekelesh and the Sherden. This confederacy went to war against Merneptah in the western Nile Delta during his 5th and 6th regnal years.

== Biography ==
He is the son of Ded, also Great Chief of the Libu, and has two brothers named Meshken and Kepper. He also had many spouses who accompanied him during his campaign.

The "Great chief Meryey" had 6 sons, all of whom were slain at Perire. He led a confederacy or an army of 40,000 men to war against Merneptah and, though successful at the beginning, was eventually defeated at Prosopis.

== Literary sources ==
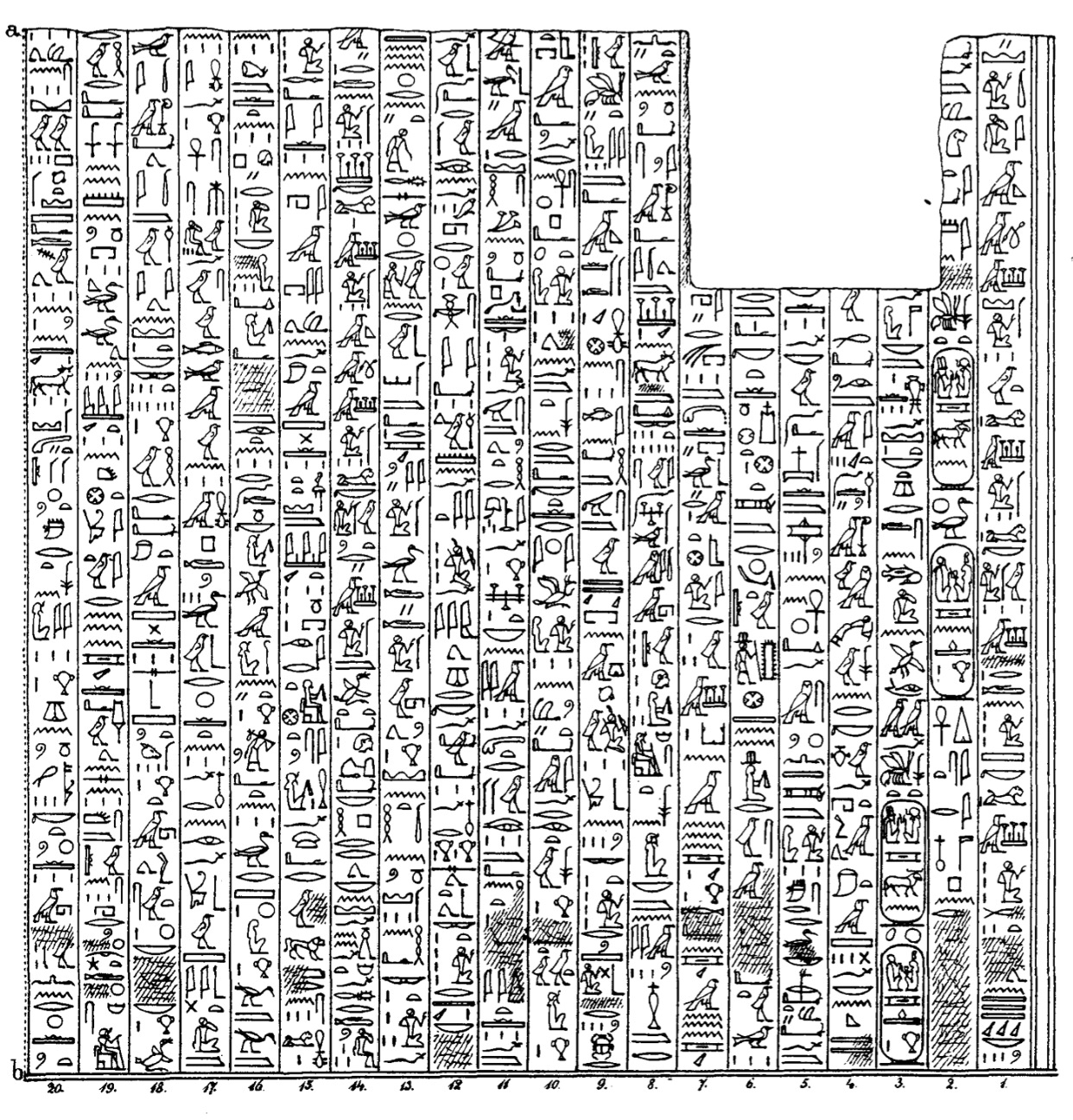
The Great Karnak inscription.

The Great Karnak Inscription describes the scene when Merneptah receives news of the attack:

"... the third season, saying: 'The wretched, fallen chief of Libya, Meryey, son of Ded, has fallen upon the country of Tehenu with his bowmen — Sherden, Shekelesh, Ekwesh, Lukka, Teresh. Taking the best of every warrior and every man of war of his country. He has brought his wife and his children — leaders of the camp, and he has reached the western boundary in the fields of Perire.

"His majesty was enraged at their report, like a lion," assembled his court and gave a rousing speech. Later, he dreamed he saw Ptah handing him a sword and saying, "Take thou (it) and banish thou the fearful heart from thee." When the bowmen went forth, says the inscription, "Amun was with them as a shield." After six hours, the surviving Nine bows threw down their weapons, abandoned their baggage and dependents, and ran for their lives. Merneptah states that he defeated the invasion, killing 6,000 soldiers and taking 9,000 prisoners.

The inscription describes in full detail Meryey's feverish emotional collapse upon the field of battle upon realizing defeat was imminent. Following his defeat against Merneptah, Meryey was replaced with one of his brother. It is also said in the Merneptah records that, after his defeat, "an evil removed his plume", in reference to the ostrich feathers worn by Ancient Libyans on their head :

"The wretched, fallen chief of Libya, fled by favor of night alone, with no plume upon his head, his two feet failed. His women were taken before his face, the grain of his supplies was plundered, and he had no water in the skin to keep him alive. The face of his brothers was hostile to slay him, one fought another among his leaders. Their camp was burned and made a roast, all his possessions were food for the troops. When he arrived in his country, he was the complaint of every one in his land. Ashamed, he bowed himself down, an evil fate removed (his) plume. They all spoke against him, among the inhabitants of his city: "He is in the power of the gods, the lords of Memphis; the lord of Egypt has cursed his name, Meryey, the abimination of Memphis is in pursuit of his children; Merneptah-Hotephirma is appointed to be his fate."

It is mentioned that in the list of propreties lost to the Egyptians, were included his silver, his gold, his vessels of bronze, the furniture of his wife, his throne, his bows, his arrows, all his works consisting of oxen, goats and donkeys.
