= Samia (mythology) =

Daughter of Maeander and wife of Ancaeus

Samia (Ancient Greek: Σαμία) was the daughter of the river-god Maeander. She became the wife of Ancaeus, the son of Poseidon and Astypalaea, who ruled over Leleges. By Ancaeus, Samia bore several children: Perilaus, Enudus, Samus, Alitherses, and a daughter named Parthenope. Parthenope later had a son, Lycomedes, by Apollo.
