= Ancient Libya =

Region west of the Nile Valley

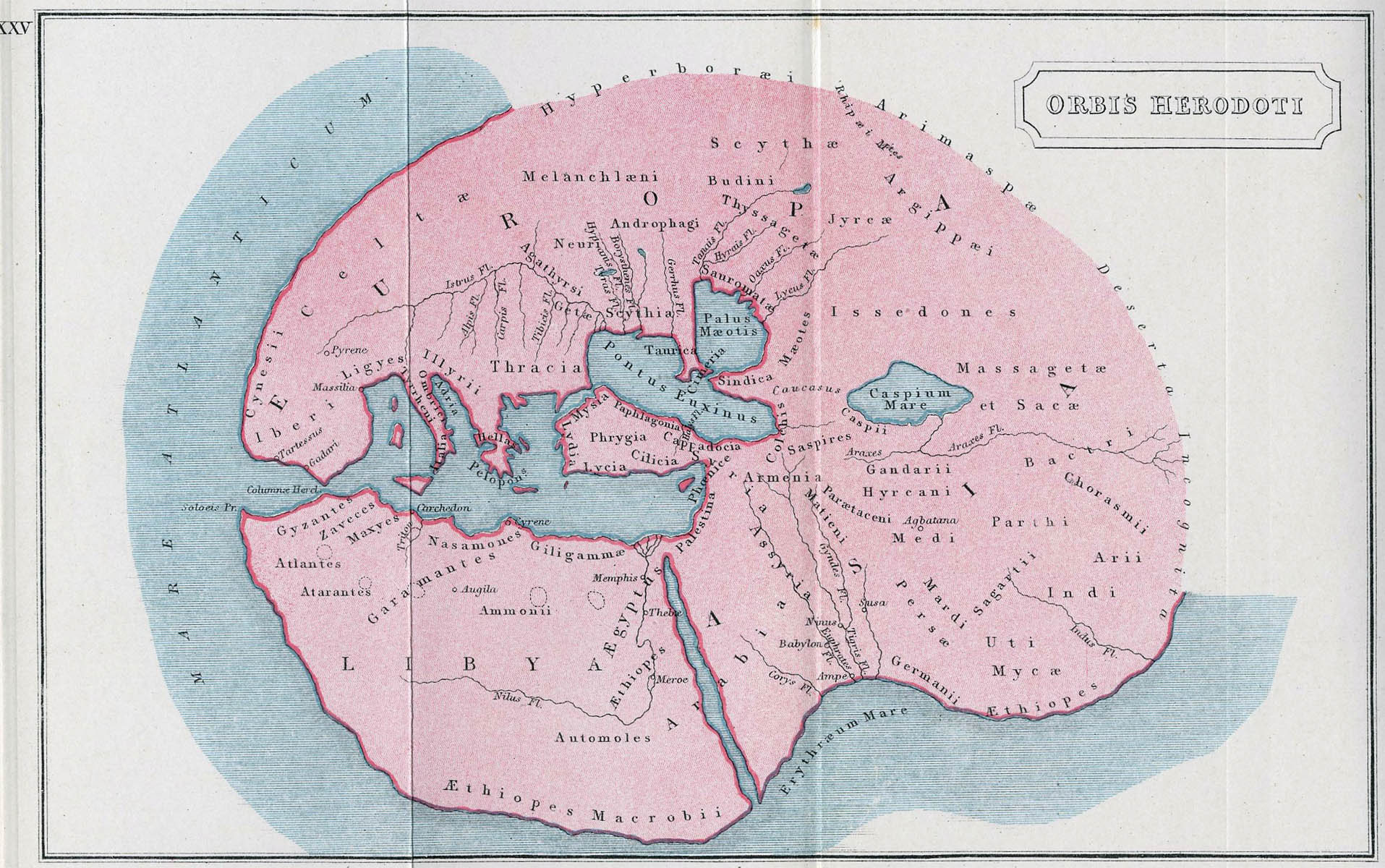
Map of the world based on Herodotus' Histories

During the Iron Age and Classical antiquity, Libya (from Greek Λιβύη: Libyē, which came from Berber: Libu) referred to the area of North Africa directly west of the Nile River (modern-day Libya, Tunisia, Algeria, and Morocco). Ancient Libya is not to be confused with the modern country of Libya, which represents the eastern part of the territory at the time. Ancient Libya was one of the three continents of the ancient world (Libya, Asia, and Europa). The territory also had part of the Mediterranean Sea named after it called the Libyan Sea or Mare Libycum (which was the part of the Mediterranean south of Crete, between Cyrene and Alexandria).

Greek and Roman geographers placed the dividing line between Ancient Libya and Asia at the Nile because the entire region south of the Mediterranean and west of the Nile was not only homogeneous linguistically (Berber languages were used throughout North Africa as far as the Atlantic coast) but also racially (with Libyan people or Berbers.)

During Roman times, the area of Ancient Libya was split into four main regions: Mauretania, Numidia, Africa Proconsularis, and Libya (which retained the original name).

Subsequently, the name ‘Africa’ was later extended to the whole continent, named after the Roman province of Africa (which occupied parts of modern-day Tunisia and modern-day Algeria).

== Mythology ==
In Greek mythology, Athena was believed to have been of Libyan origins and was therefore nicknamed Athene Tritogeneia ("born of Trito"), from her birth in Lake Tritonis in North Africa (modern-day Algeria and Tunisia) (Note: Herodotus. 4.189: "It would seem that the robe and aegis of the images of Athena were copied by the Greeks from the Libyan women; for except that Libyan women dress in leather, and that the tassels of their goatskin cloaks are not snakes but thongs of hide, in everything else their equipment is the same. And in fact, the very name betrays that the attire of the statues of Pallas has come from Libya; for Libyan women wear the hairless tasselled “aegea” over their dress, colored with madder, and the Greeks have changed the name of these aegeae into their “aegides.” Furthermore, in my opinion the ceremonial chant2 first originated in Libya: for the women of that country chant very tunefully. And it is from the Libyans that the Greeks have learned to drive four-horse chariots.") (Note: Herodotus.IV.180:"They celebrate a yearly festival of Athena, where their maidens are separated into two bands and fight each other with stones and sticks, thus (they say) honoring in the way of their ancestors that native goddess whom we call Athena. Maidens who die of their wounds are called false virgins. Before the girls are set fighting, the whole people choose the fairest maid, and arm her with a Corinthian helmet and Greek panoply, to be then mounted on a chariot and drawn all along the lake shore.") where she is considered native to the land. In this version of the story she is the daughter of Poseidon and Tritonis a Libyan lake nymph. (Note: TRITONIS was the goddess-nymph of the salt-water lake Tritonis in Libya, North Africa. In the story of the birth of the Libyan Athena, Triton--a Libyan sea-god sometimes identified with Poseidon--and Tritonis were the parents of two daughters named Athena and Pallas. The first daughter accidentally killed the second in a mock battle. The story was re-enacted by the Makhlyes and Ausean tribes in an annual festival.) (Note: Pausanias in his DESCRIPTION OF GREECE writes: "Above the Kerameikos [in Athens] and the portico called the King's Portico is a temple of Hephaistos. I was not surprised that by it stands a statue of Athena, because I knew the story about Erikhthonios. But when I saw that the statue of Athena had blue eyes I found out that the legend about them is Libyan. For the Libyans have a saying that the Goddess is the daughter of Poseidon and Lake Tritonis, and for this reason has blue eyes like Poseidon.") In another version of the story in the same source, they say that she was daughter of Poseidon and Lake Tritonis, and that, being for some reason angry at her father, she gave herself to Zeus, who made her his own daughter, on the other hand some say that she sprang from the forehead of her father Zeus in the same location in North Africa. According to Herodotus, it is the Libyans who taught Greeks how to ride four-horse chariots, (Note: Herodotus : "it is from the Libyans that the Greeks have learned to drive four-horse chariots."-The histories IV.189.III) this is further shown when Mastanbal the prince of Numidia who is well versed in Greek literature. A sportsman in his youth, the prince took part in chariot races and the Panathenaic Games which only populations whom the greeks considered equal to them culturally and religiously were allowed to participate. Mastanbal was a sportsman who was passionate about horseback riding. He owned a stud farm of purebred horses. Around 168 BC or 164 BC, he won a gold medal for his people in Numidia at the Athens Hippodrome at the Panathenaic Games in the prestigious horse-drawn chariot racing event.

In Pseudo-Apollodorus, the Greeks proceeded to write of Hyperborea as a place that existed in ancient Libya somewhere within or between the Atlas ranges of North Africa (Note: Pseudo-Apollodorus, Bibliotheca 2. 119 - 120 : "So when Herakles reached Atlas among the Hyperboreans, he remembered Prometheus' advice and took over the sphere. Atlas picked three apples from the garden of the Hesperides, then returned to Herakles. Not wanting to hold up the sphere, he told Herakles that he should carry the applies back to Eurystheus,") (Note: Nonnus, Dionysiaca 3. 349 ff : "And away by the boundary of Libya my [the Pleiad Elektra's] father still suffers hardship, old Atlas with chafing shoulders bowed, upholding the seven-zoned vault of the sky [seven-zoned, i.e. from the sun, moon, planets and fixed stars].") as that was the well-known dwelling place of Atlas as he was enduring punishment by Zeus, he was visited by Herakles as well as Perseus in North Africa. This coincides exactly with North Africans being well known for their worship of their sun god 'Tafukt' or commonly identified by the Greeks as Apollo; (Note: Hérodote, IV, 188) they were believed to inhabit a sunny, temperate, and divinely-blessed land. The oldest myths portray them as the favorites of Apollo, and some ancient Greek writers regarded them as the mythical founders of Apollo's shrines at Delos and Delphi. Masinissa received a golden crown from the inhabitants of Delos as he had offered them several shiploads of grain to the temple of Apollo in Delos the famous birthplace of the sun god and his twin sister Artemis. (Note: A statue of Masinissa was set up in Delos in honour of him as well as an inscription dedicated to him in Delos by a native from Rhodes. His sons too had statues of them erected on the island of Delos and the King of Bithynia, Nicomedes, had also dedicated a statue to Masinissa.)

One of the ancient Greek mythological explanations for the origin of the name is Libya, the daughter of Epaphus and Memphis. A different tradition is recorded by Andron of Halicarnassus, who relates that Oceanus had two wives, Pompholyge and Parthenope, and fathered four daughters: Asia and Libya by one wife and Thrace and Europe by the other. In this account, these daughters serve as eponymous ancestors, with their names being bestowed upon the regions they came to represent.

== Inhabitants ==
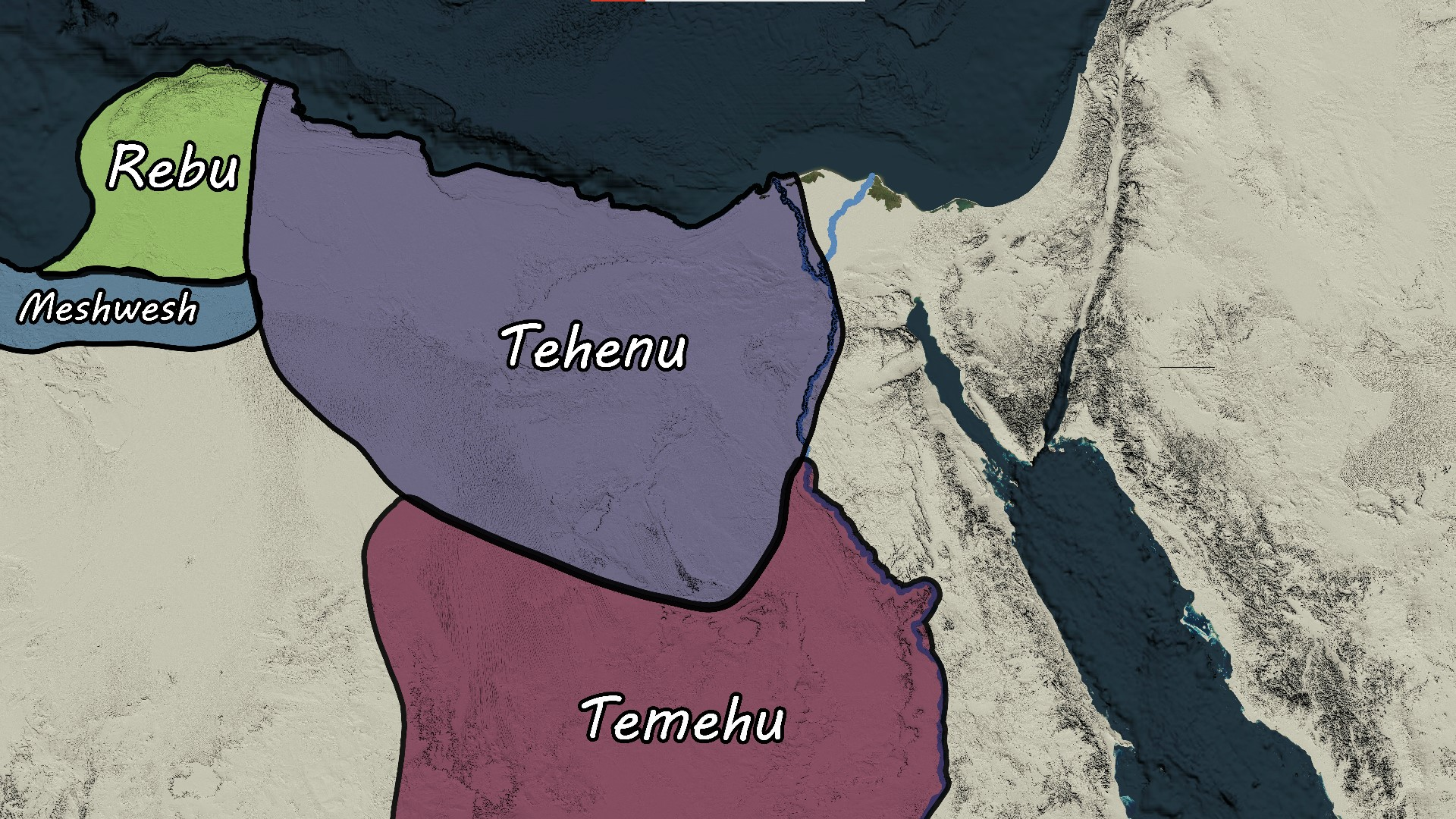
Libyan Tribes bordering ancient Egypt (3200 BC)

Berbers are native to North Africa and have established their culture for thousands of years alongside the Egyptians. Egypt today contains the Siwa Oasis, which borders Libya at the Western Desert. The Siwi language, one of the Berber languages, is still spoken in the area by around 21,000 people. Their ancient Egyptian neighbors referred to the various Libyan groups and tribes as the Tehenu, Temehu, Rebu and Meshwesh.

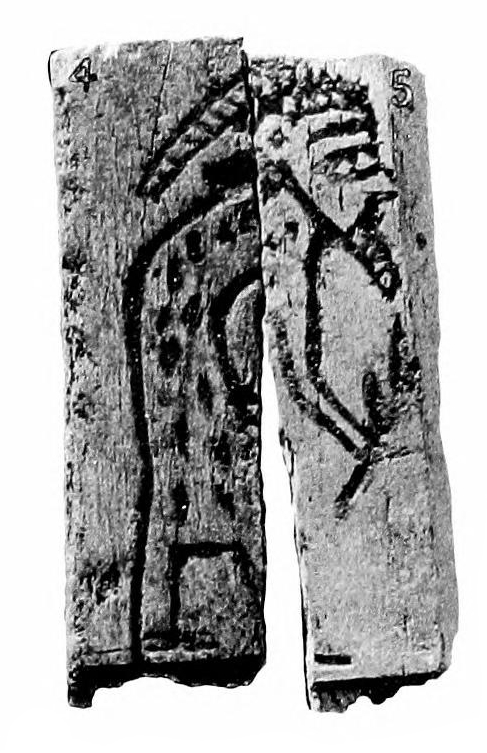
Likely Libyan tributary, with headdress and spotted robe. First Dynasty of Egypt, 2960–2770 BC, Tomb of Menes B17, Abydos.

Homer names Libya, in the Odyssey (IX.95; XXIII.311). Homer used the name in a geographic sense, while he called its inhabitants "Lotus-eaters". After Homer, Aeschylus, Pindar, and other ancient Greek writers used the name. Herodotus (1.46) used Λιβύη Libúē to indicate the African continent; the Líbues proper were the light-skinned North Africans, while those south of Egypt (and Elephantine on the Nile) were known to him as "Aethiopians"; this was also the understanding of later Greek geographers such as Diodorus Siculus, Strabo...etc, amongst other writers.

In the Hellenistic period, the native Berbers were known collectively as Libyans to the Greco-Roman world, a Greek term for the inhabitants of the Maghreb, they identified the Massylii, the Masaessyli, the Gaetuli, the Phareusiens and the Mauri.

Libyans were known far and wide as glorious warriors with extraordinary physical strength; they were efficient in battle and effective when combined with an army. They were either employed as mercenaries or were made part of an army as was the case with Numidian cavalry. Polybius first mentions Numidian cavalry as part of the Carthaginian army during the First Punic War. In the ranks of both Roman Empire and Ancient Carthage, they completely overturned the tide of battle in Cannae for Hannibal and Battle of Zama for Scipio Africanus. Virgil speaks of the Libyans in this way: "The surrounding lands are Libyan, a race unbeatable in war."

After the Egyptians, the Greeks, Romans, and Byzantines mentioned various other tribes in Libya. Later tribal names differ from the Egyptian ones, but probably, some tribes were named in the Egyptian sources, as well as the later ones. Scholars believe the Meshwesh are the people called the Mazyes by Hektaios and Maxyes by Herodotus, while it was called "Mazaces" and "Mazax" in Latin sources. All those names are similar to the name used by the Berbers for themselves, such as Imazighen.

Late-period sources give more detailed descriptions of Libya and its inhabitants. The ancient historian Herodotus describes Libya and the Libyans in his fourth book, The Libyan Book. Writers such as Pliny the Elder, Diodorus Siculus, and Procopius also contributed to what is now primary source material on ancient Libya and the Libyans.

== Name ==
The name is based on the ethnonym Libu (Ancient Greek: Λίβυες Líbyes, Latin: Libyes). The name Libya (in use since 1934 for the modern country formerly known as Tripolitania and Barca) was the Latin designation for the region of the Maghreb, from the Ancient Greek (Attic Greek: Λιβύη Libúē, Doric Greek: Λιβύᾱ Libúā). In Classical Greece, the term had a broader meaning, encompassing the continent that later (second century BC) became known as Africa, which, in antiquity, was assumed to constitute one third of the world's land mass, Europe and Asia combined making up the other two thirds.

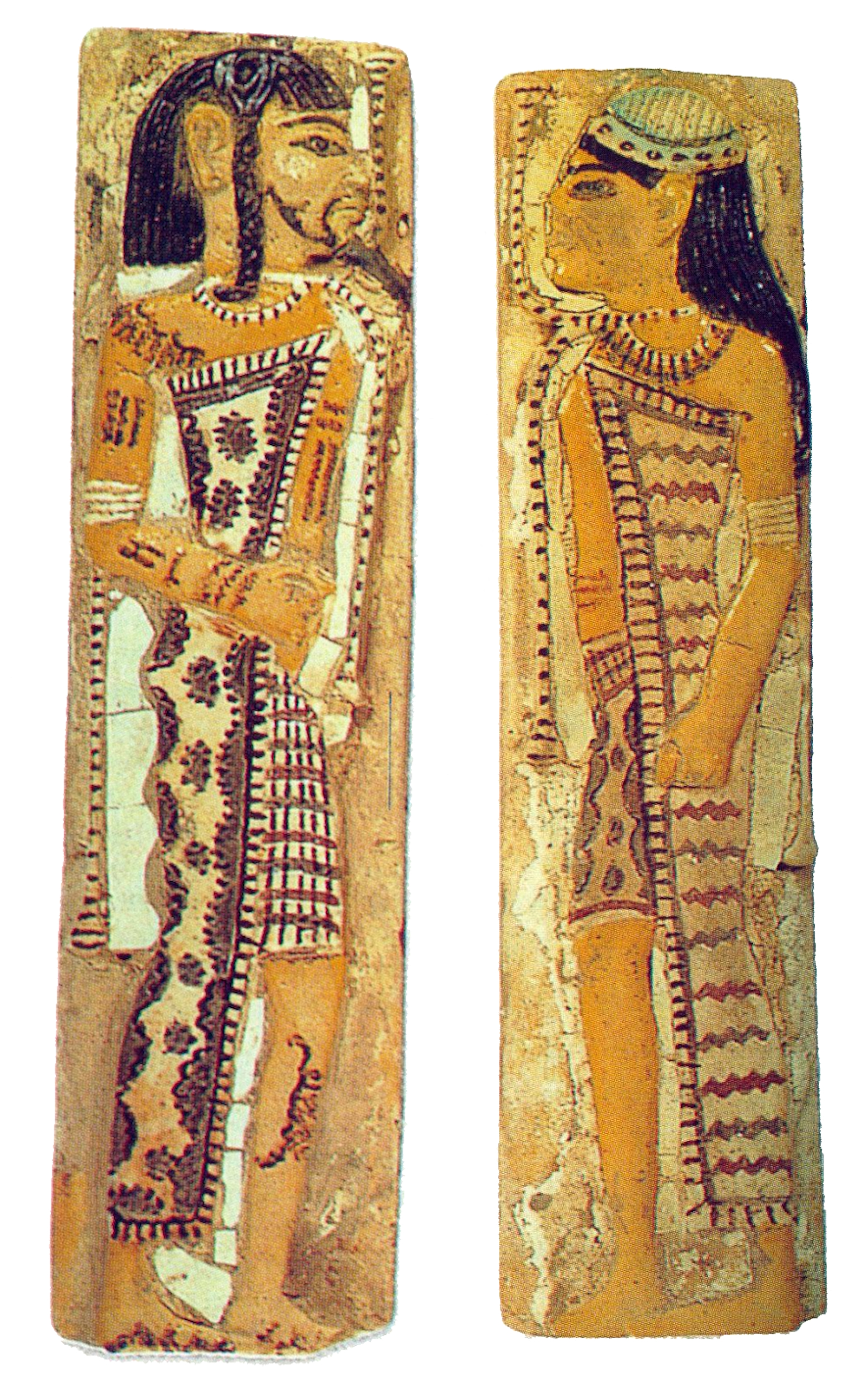
Ancient Egyptian ceramic tile of Libyans (Ramesses III prisoner tiles, 1189–1077 BC)

The Libu are attested since the Late Bronze Age as inhabiting the region (Egyptian R'bw, Punic: 𐤋𐤁𐤉 lby). The oldest known documented references to the Libu date to Ramesses II and his successor Merneptah, pharaohs of the Nineteenth Dynasty of Egypt, during the 13th century BC. LBW appears as an ethnic name on the Merneptah Stele to designate Libyans.

Menelaus had travelled there on his way home from Troy; it was a land of wonderful richness, where the lambs have horns as soon as they are born, where ewes lamb three times a year and no shepherd ever goes short of milk, meat or cheese.

When the Ancient Greeks actually settled in Libya, the old name taken from the Egyptians was applied by the Greeks of Cyrenaica, who may have coexisted with the Libu. Later, the name appeared in the Hebrew language, written in the Bible as Lehabim and Lubim, indicating the ethnic population and the geographic territory as well. In the neo-Punic inscriptions, it was written as Lby for the masculine noun, and Lbt for the feminine noun of Libyan.

Latin absorbed the name from Greek and the Punic languages. The Romans would have known them before their colonization of North Africa because of the Libyan role in the Punic Wars against the Romans. The Romans used the name Líbues, but only when referring to Barca and the Libyan Desert of Egypt. The other Libyan territories were called "Africa", which were Roman provinces.

Classical Arabic literature called Libya Lubya, indicating a speculative territory west of Egypt. Modern Arabic uses Libya. The Lwatae, the tribe of Ibn Battuta, as the Arabs called it, was a Berber tribe that mainly was situated in Cyrenaica. This tribe may have ranged from the Atlantic Ocean to modern Libya, however, and was referred to by Corippius as Laguatan; he linked them with the Maures. Ibn Khaldun's Muqaddimah states Luwa was an ancestor of this tribe. He writes that the Berbers add an "a" and "t" to the name for the plural forms. Subsequently, it became rendered as Lwat.

Conversely, the Arabs adopted the name as a singular form, adding an "h" for the plural form in Arabic. Ibn Khaldun disagrees with Ibn Hazam, who claimed, mostly on the basis of Berber sources, that the Lwatah, in addition to the Sadrata and the Mzata, were from the Qibts (Egyptians). According to Ibn Khaldun, this claim is incorrect because Ibn Hazam had not read the books of the Berber scholars.

Oric Bates, a historian, considers that the name Libu or LBW would be derived from the name Luwatah whilst the name Luwatah is a derivation of the name Libu. Furthermore, Bates considered all the Libyan tribes to be a single civilization around 3000 BC united under central Libu and Meshwesh control. Mainly situated around Cyrenaica and Marsa matruh.

The ancient Libu and Meshwesh plundered west into Zawyet Umm El Rakham, which allowed them trade with Mycenaeans, Cyprus, Levant and the Aegean people. The Mycenaean Greek in specific seemed to have clashed with the Libyans.

== History ==
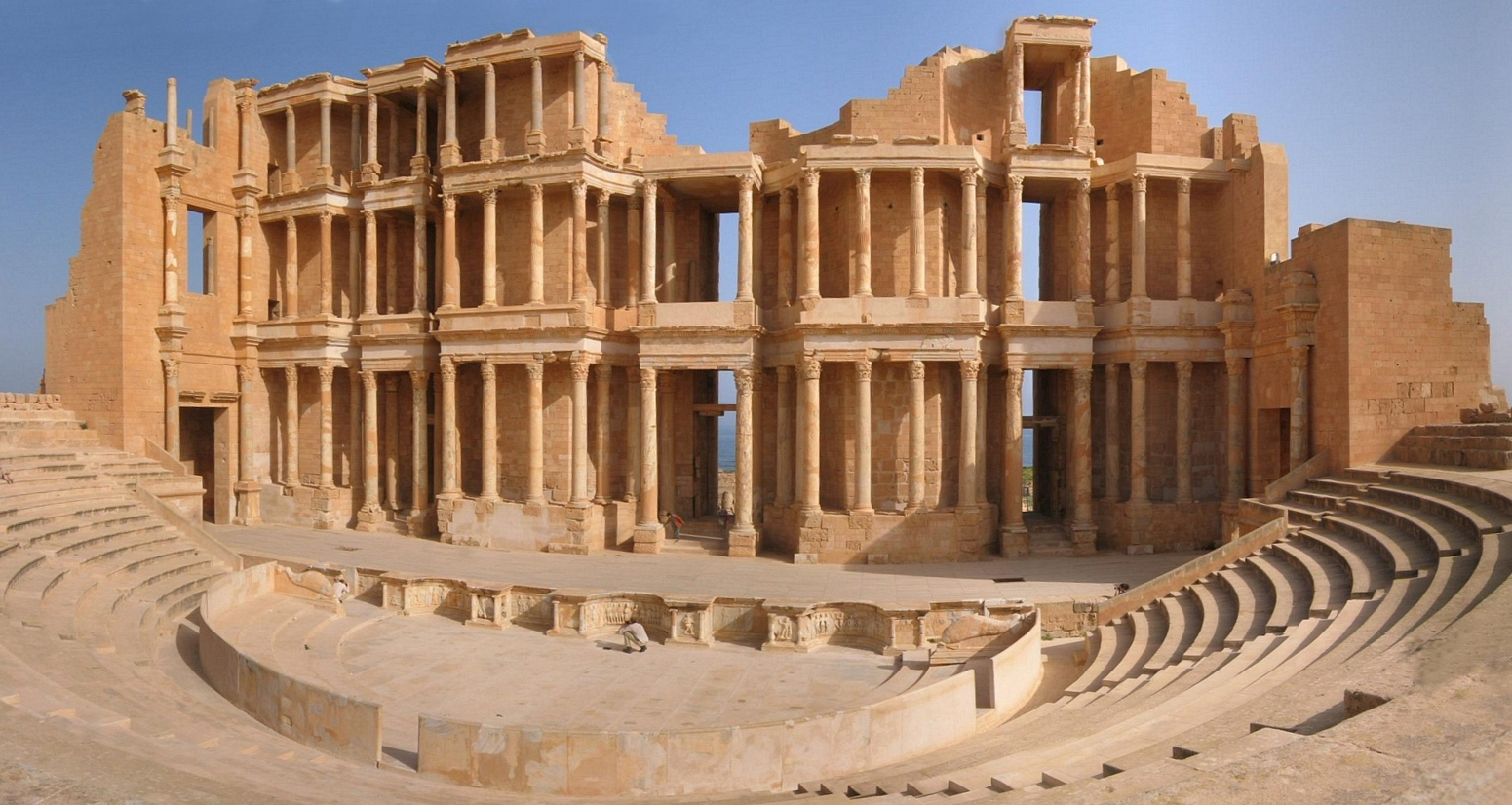
Archaeological Site of Sabratha, Libya

Compared with the history of Egypt, historians know little about the history of Libya, as there are few surviving written records. Information on ancient Libya comes from archaeological evidence and historic sources written by Egyptian scribes, as well as the ancient Greeks, Romans, and Byzantines, and later from Arabs of Medieval times.

Since the Neolithic, the climate of North Africa has become drier over time. A reminder of the desertification of the area is provided by megalithic remains, which occur in great variety of form and in vast numbers in presently arid and uninhabitable wastelands: dolmens and circles akin to Stonehenge, cairns, underground cells excavated in rock, barrows topped with huge slabs, and step-pyramid-like mounds. Most remarkable are the trilithons, some still standing, some fallen, which occur isolated or in rows, and consist of two squared uprights standing on a common pedestal that supports a huge transverse beam. In the Terrgurt valley, Cowper says: "There had been originally no less than eighteen or twenty megalithic trilithons, in a line, each with its massive altar placed before it".

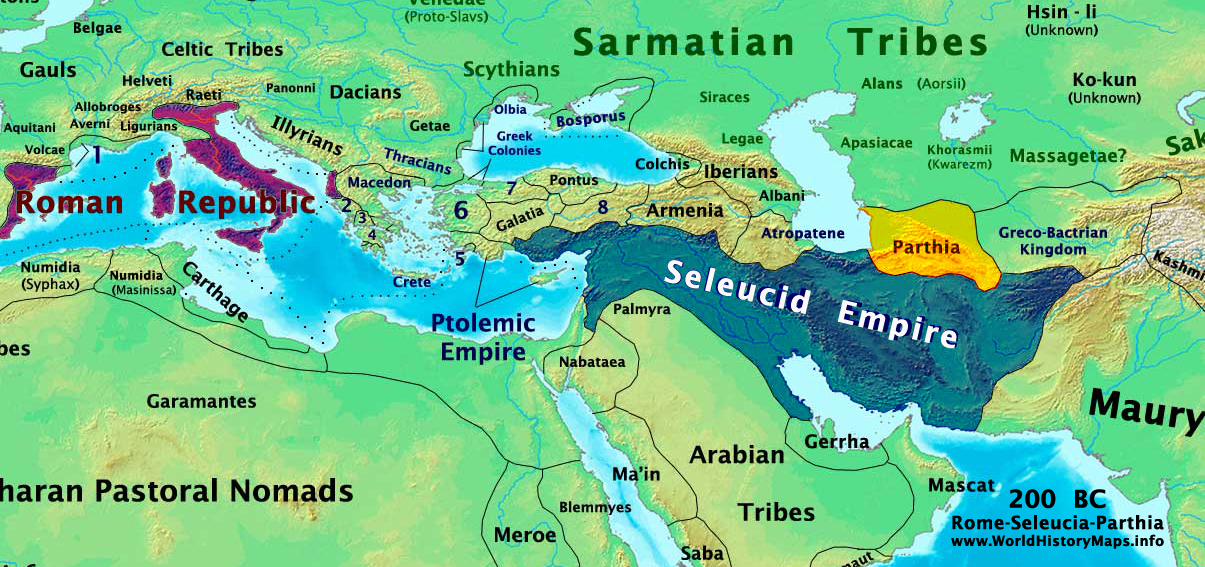
The territory of the ancient Garamantes in the Fezzan. Falling groundwater levels and the resulting failure of the foggara irrigation system contributed to the decline of their society.

In ancient times, the Phoenicians/Carthaginians, the Saite Egyptians, the Persian Achaemenid Empire (see Libya (satrapy)), the Macedonian Empire of Alexander the Great and his Ptolemaic successors from Egypt ruled variously parts of Libya. With the Roman conquest, the entire region of present-day Libya became part of the Roman Empire. Following the fall of the Empire, Vandals, and local representatives of the Byzantine Empire also ruled all or parts of Libya. The territory of modern Libya had separate histories until Roman times, as Tripoli and Cyrenaica.

Cyrenaica, by contrast, was Greek before it was Roman. It was also known as Pentapolis, the "five cities" being Cyrene (near the village of Shahat) with its port of Apollonia (Marsa Susa), Arsinoe (Tocra), Berenice (Benghazi) and Barca (Merj). From the oldest and most famous of the Greek colonies, the fertile coastal plain took the name of Cyrenaica.

These five cities were also known as the Western Pentapolis; not to be confused with the Pentapolis of the Roman era on the current west Italian coast.

== Geography ==
The exact boundaries of the whole of ancient Libya are unknown, but it likely constituted the western regions of Ancient Egypt in 3100 BC, and was known as "Tjehenu" to the Egyptians. To the ancient Greeks, Libya was one of the three known continents along with Asia and Europe. In this sense, Libya was the whole known African continent to the west of the Nile Valley and extended south of Egypt. Herodotus described the inhabitants of Africa as two peoples: The Libyans in northern Africa and the Ethiopians in the south. According to Herodotus, Libya began where Ancient Egypt ended, and extended to Cape Spartel, south of Tangier on the Atlantic coast. Modern geographers suspect that ancient Libyans may have experienced loss of forests, reliable fresh water sources, and game availability as the area became more desert-like.

== Later sources ==
Ibn Khaldun, who dedicated the main part of his book Kitab el'ibar, which is known as "The history of the Berbers", did not use the names Libya and Libyans, but instead used Arabic names: The Old Maghreb, (El-Maghrib el-Qadim), and the Berbers (El-Barbar or El-Barabera(h)).

== Ancient Libyan (Berber) tribes ==
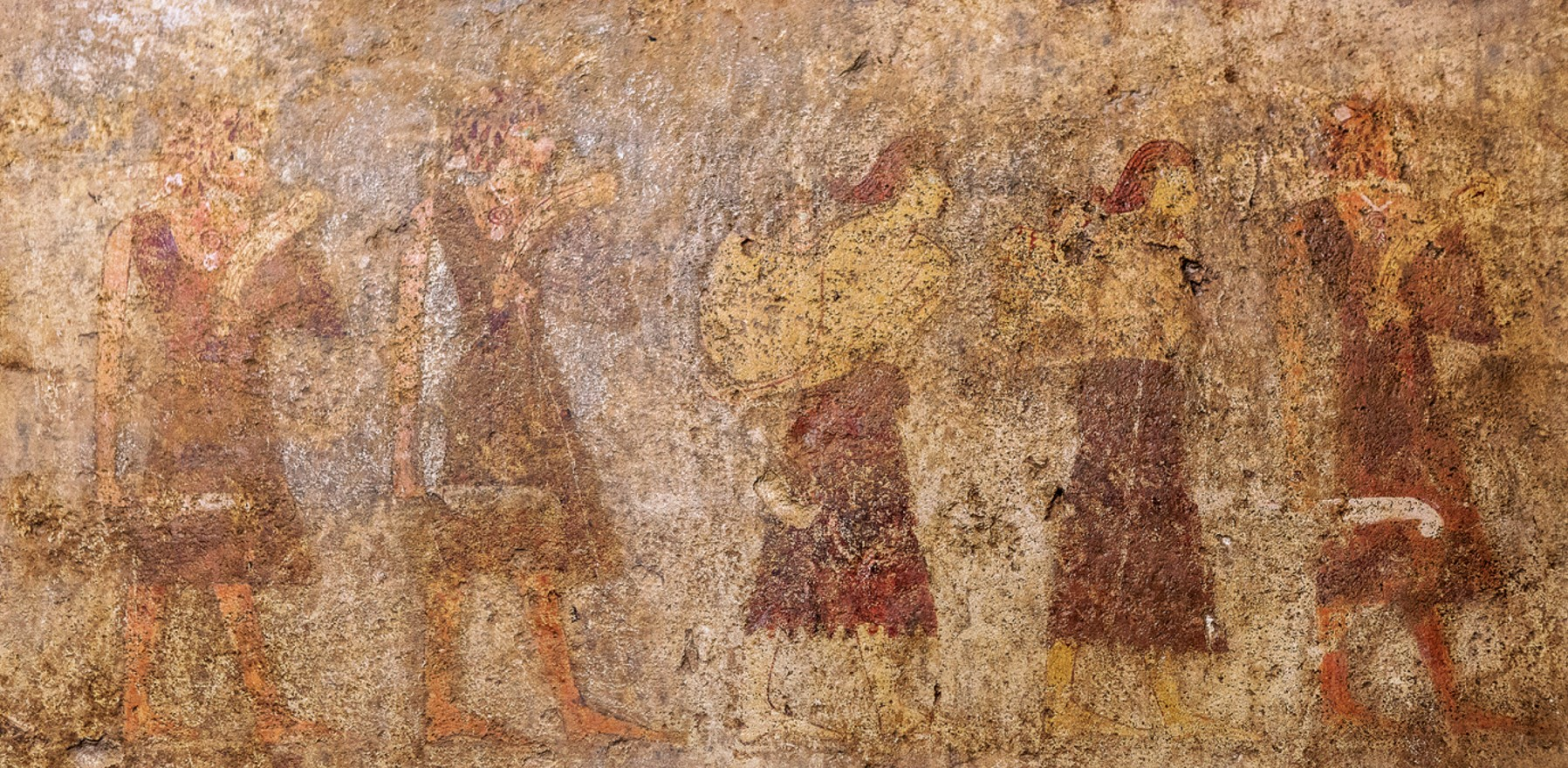
Detail of a Libyan Group from the Tomb of Khnumhotep I, 12th Dynasty

There were many tribes in ancient Libya, including the now extinct Psylli, with the Libu being the most prominent. The ancient Libyans were mainly pastoral nomads, living off their goats, sheep and other livestock. For subsistence, milk, meat, hides and wool were gathered from their livestock for food, pitching tents and as clothing.

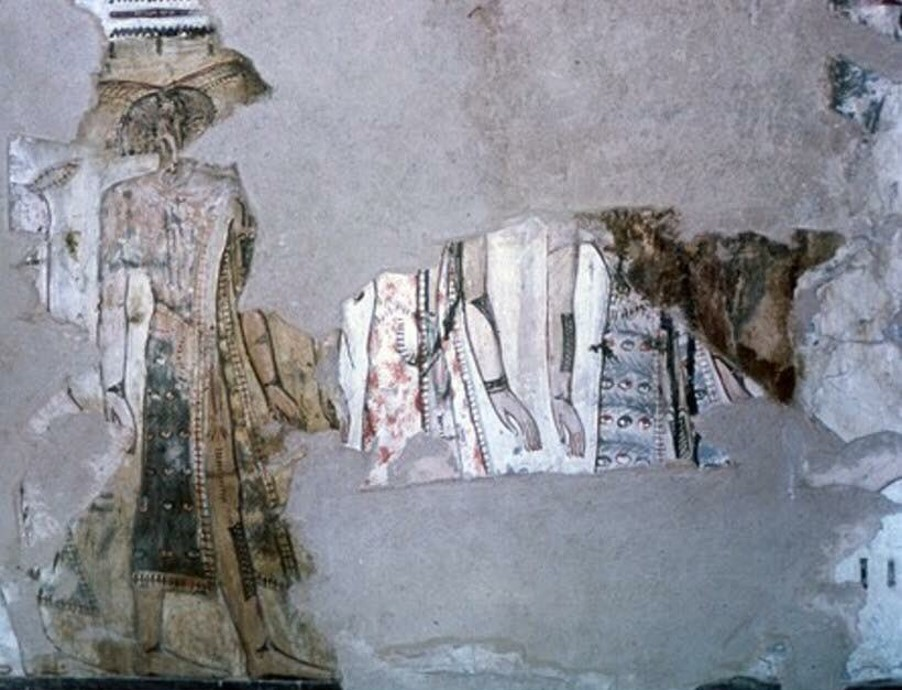

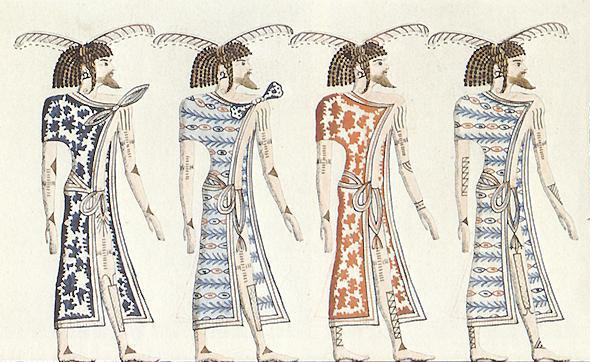
Libyans from the Tomb of Seti I (1290-1279 BC)

Ancient Egyptian sources describe Libyan men with long hair, braided and bearded, neatly parted from different sides and decorated with feathers attached to leather bands around the crown of the head while wearing thin robes of antelope hide, dyed and printed, crossing the shoulder and coming down until mid calf length to make a robe. Older men kept long braided beards, while women wore the same robes as men, plaited, decorated hair and both sexes wore heavy jewelry. Depictions of Libyans in Egyptian reliefs show prominent and numerous tattoos, very similar to traditional Berber tattoos still seen today. Their weapons included bows and arrows, hatchets, spears and daggers.

The Libyan script that was used in Libya was mostly a funerary script. It is difficult to understand, and there are a number of variations.

Ibn Khaldun divided the Berbers into the Batr and the Baranis.

Herodotus divided them into Eastern Libyans and Western Libyans. Eastern Libyans were nomadic shepherds east of Lake Tritonis. Western Libyans were sedentary farmers who lived west of Lake Tritonis. a catastrophic change reduced the vast body of fresh water to a seasonal lake or marsh.

Ibn Khaldun and Herodotus distinguish the Libyans on the basis of their lifestyles rather than ethnic background, those practicing agriculture, and the others nomadic pastoralism. Modern historians tend to follow Herodotus's classical distinctions. Examples include Oric Bates in his book The Eastern Libyans. Some other historians have used the modern name of the Berbers in their works, such as the French historian Gabriel Camps.

The Libyan tribes mentioned in these sources were: "Adyrmachidae", "Atarantians" "Giligamae", "Asbystae", "Marmaridae", "Auschisae", "Nasamones", "Macae", "Lotus-eaters (or Lotophagi)", "Garamantes", "Gaetulians", "Mauri", and "Luwatae", as well as many others.

== See also ==
- Libya (daughter of Epaphus)
- History of North Africa
- North Africa during classical antiquity
- Necropolis of Cyrene
