= Kalamos =

Son of Meander in Greek mythology

Kalamos (Ancient Greek: Κάλαμος, lit. 'reed, reed pen'; Latin: Calamus) is a Greek mythological figure. He is son of Meander, the god of the Maeander river.

== Mythology ==
A story in Nonnus's Dionysiaca tells about the love of two youths, Kalamos and Karpos. Karpos drowned in the Meander river while the two were competing in a swimming contest. In his grief, Kalamos allowed himself to drown also. He was then transformed into a water reed, whose rustling in the wind was interpreted as a sigh of lamentation. The acorus calamusare water reed which has a fragrant scent (more commonly known as Sweet Flag) is named after Calamus and this myth.

Walt Whitman's "Calamus" poems in Leaves of Grass may have been inspired by this story.

== Etymology of the word Kalamos ==
Similar words can be found in Sanskrit (कलम kalama, meaning "reed" and "pen" as well as a type of rice), Hebrew (kulmus, meaning quill) and Latin (calamus) as well as the ancient Greek Κάλαμος (Kalamos). The Arabic word قلم qalam (meaning "pen" or "reed pen") is likely to have been borrowed from one of these languages in antiquity. The Swahili word kalamu ("pen") comes from the Arabic qalam.

The Greeks also used the term for various wind instruments, especially but not necessarily reed instruments, including the aulos, or the plural kalamoi for the syrinx.

From the Latin calamus come a number of modern English words:

- calamus (aka Sweet Flag), a wetland reed
- calamari, meaning "squid", via the Latin calamarium, "ink horn" or "pen case", as reeds were then used as writing implements
- calumet, a French, colonial-era word often used for a Native American ceremonial pipe
- shawm, a medieval oboe-like instrument (whose sound is produced by a vibrating reed mouthpiece)
- chalumeau register, the lower notes of a clarinet's range (another reed instrument)

== See also ==
- Qalam, Arabic pen

== Bibliography ==
- Nonnus of Panopolis, Dionysiaca translated by William Henry Denham Rouse (1863-1950), from the Loeb Classical Library, Cambridge, MA, Harvard University Press, 1940. Online version at the Topos Text Project.
- Nonnus of Panopolis, Dionysiaca. 3 Vols. W.H.D. Rouse. Cambridge, MA., Harvard University Press; London, William Heinemann, Ltd. 1940-1942. Greek text available at the Perseus Digital Library.
