= Qalam Collegiate Academy =

Coordinates: 32°58′26″N 96°42′20″W

Qalam Collegiate Academy is a private faith-based middle and high school (grades 5-12) in Richardson, Texas. Named after the chapter Qalam in the Quran. Qalam is enjoyed by the majority of the students at the School. The school is now under a different administration as of Fall 2018, with new principals and teachers. The School has won many awards at MIST
