= Mazices =

Late Antiquity term for Berbers

The Mazices were Berbers of North Africa who appear in classical and late antique Greek and Latin sources. Many variants of the name are known: Maxyes in Herodotus; Mazyes in Hecataeus; Mazaces; Mazikes; Mazazaces; etc. They are all derived from the Berber autoethnonym Imazighen (singular Amazigh). These terms were used both for Berbers in general and for certain Berber tribes. It is not clear if the original Berber term was used to refer to all Berbers or only a tribe or other subset. The Egyptian term Meshwesh for a tribe of ancient Libyans is probably a cognate.

In the 1st century AD, Lucan uses Mazax, the singular form of Mazaces, as a collective noun for the people. In the 3rd century, the Chronicle of Pseudo-Hippolytus placed the Mazices on the same level as the Mauri, Gaetuli and Afri.

In the last decade of the 4th century, the Mazices and Austurians began ravaging Cyrenaica. During the tenure of the strategos Cerealis, the Mazices besieged Cyrene. Bishop Synesius took part in the defence of the city. The period of unrest in Cyrenaica lasts until about 410. In 407 or 408, the Mazices raided the monasteries of Scetis. Among their victims were Abba Moses the Black and seven companions. John the Dwarf and Bishoi also fled Scetis as a result of this raid. The Mazices raided again in 410 and 434. About 445, the Mazices harried some Blemmyes retreating from a raid on an Egyptian oasis. In 491, they raided Cyrenaica again.

During the reign of Byzantine Emperor Justin I (518–527), the Mazices plundered Egypt in conjunction with the Blemmyes. In the 580s, several monasteries in the Wadi El Natrun were razed by Mazices. Some 3,500 monks were dispersed into the Levant.
