= Reed pen =

Writing implement of the Near, Middle, and Far East

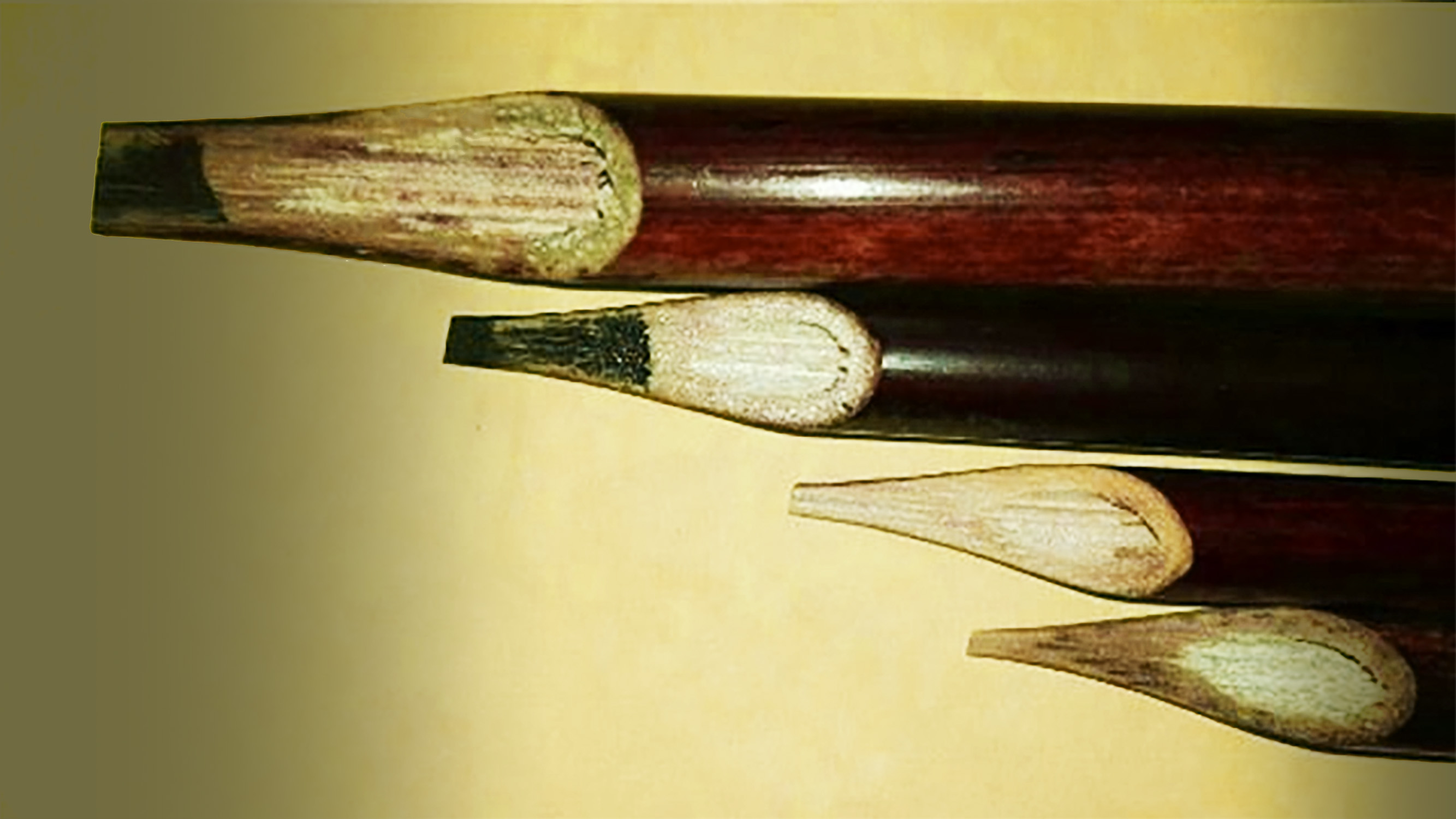
The inkstained cut tips of reed pens

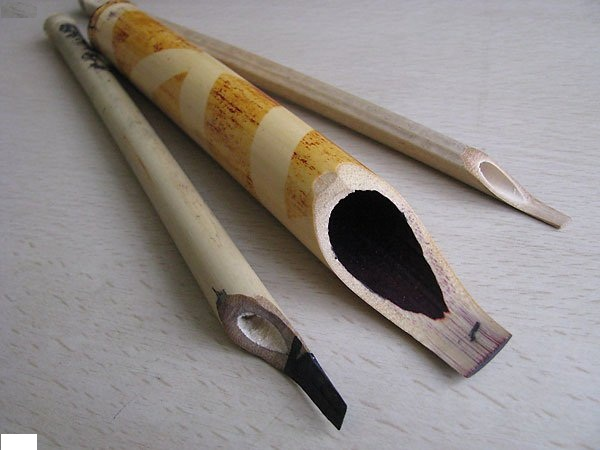
Varying diameters

A reed pen (Ancient Greek: κάλαμοι kalamoi; singular κάλαμος kalamos) or bamboo pen (traditional Chinese: 竹筆; simplified Chinese: 竹笔; pinyin: zhú bǐ) is a writing implement made by cutting and shaping a single reed straw or length of bamboo.

== History and manufacture ==
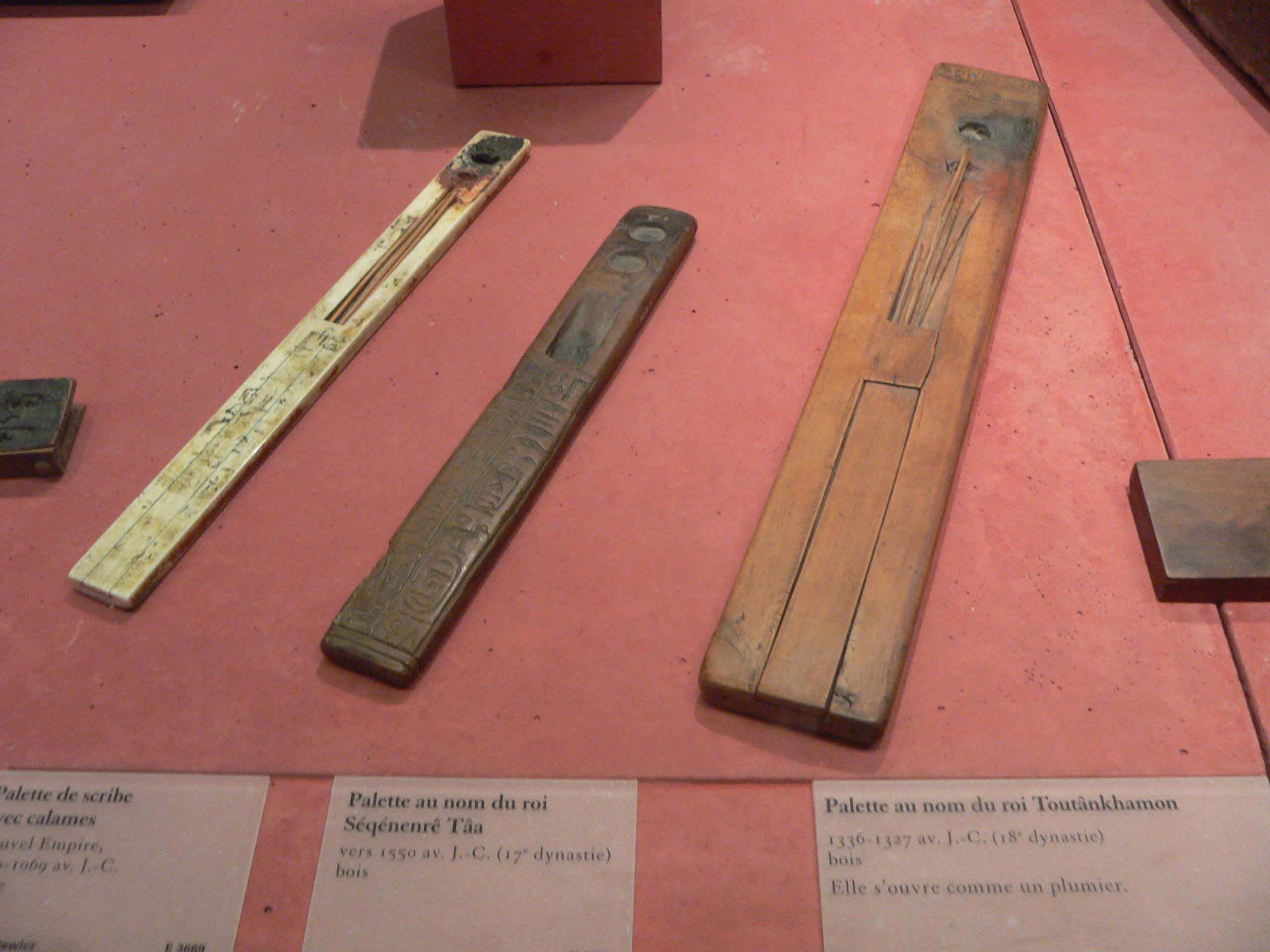
Egyptian reed pens inside ivory and wooden palettes, the Louvre

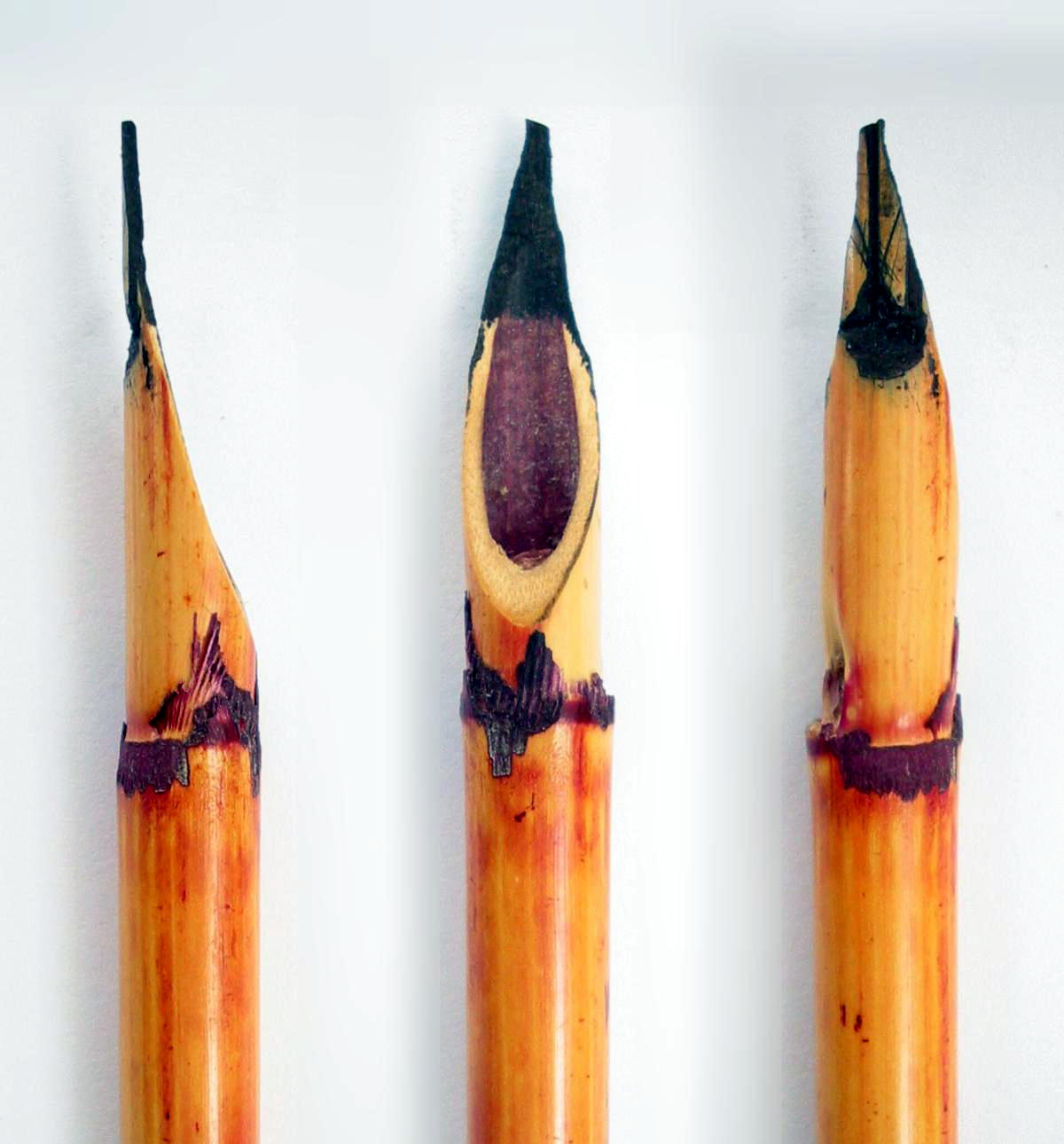
Three views of a narrow tip

Reed pens with regular features such as a split nib have been found in Ancient Egyptian sites dating from the 4th century BC. Reed pens were used for writing on papyrus, and were the most common writing implement in antiquity. In Mesopotamia and Sumer, reed pens were used by pressing the tips into clay tablets to create written records, using cuneiform.

The Ancient Roman calamus was made of the stem of a reed growing in marshy places, of which the best were obtained from Egypt. The stem was first softened, then dried, and cut and split with a knife, as quill pens are made.

Reed pens known as qalams (Arabic: قلم) are still widely used to write Islamic calligraphy.

To make a reed pen, scribes would take an undamaged piece of reed about 20 centimetres (7.9 in) long, and leave the end that would be cut into a point in water for some time. This ensured that the pen would not splinter when crafted. They made a series of cuts that would shape the nib of the pen until it was flat enough, and pointed. The pointed end was then cut off, not too far from the point, to form a squared end suitable for writing. At the end they would start the split, which would act as an ink barrel, from the tip of the nib and lengthen it until it was of the proper length. They took care not to lengthen it extensively, because the pen was at risk of snapping in half. Being skilled at making reed pens was important for early scribes due to the pen's low durability.

Reed pens are stiffer than quill pens cut from feathers and do not retain a sharp point for long unless constantly sharpened. This led to them being replaced by quills. Nevertheless, a reed pen can make bold strokes, and it remains an important tool in calligraphy.

== Reed pen in art ==
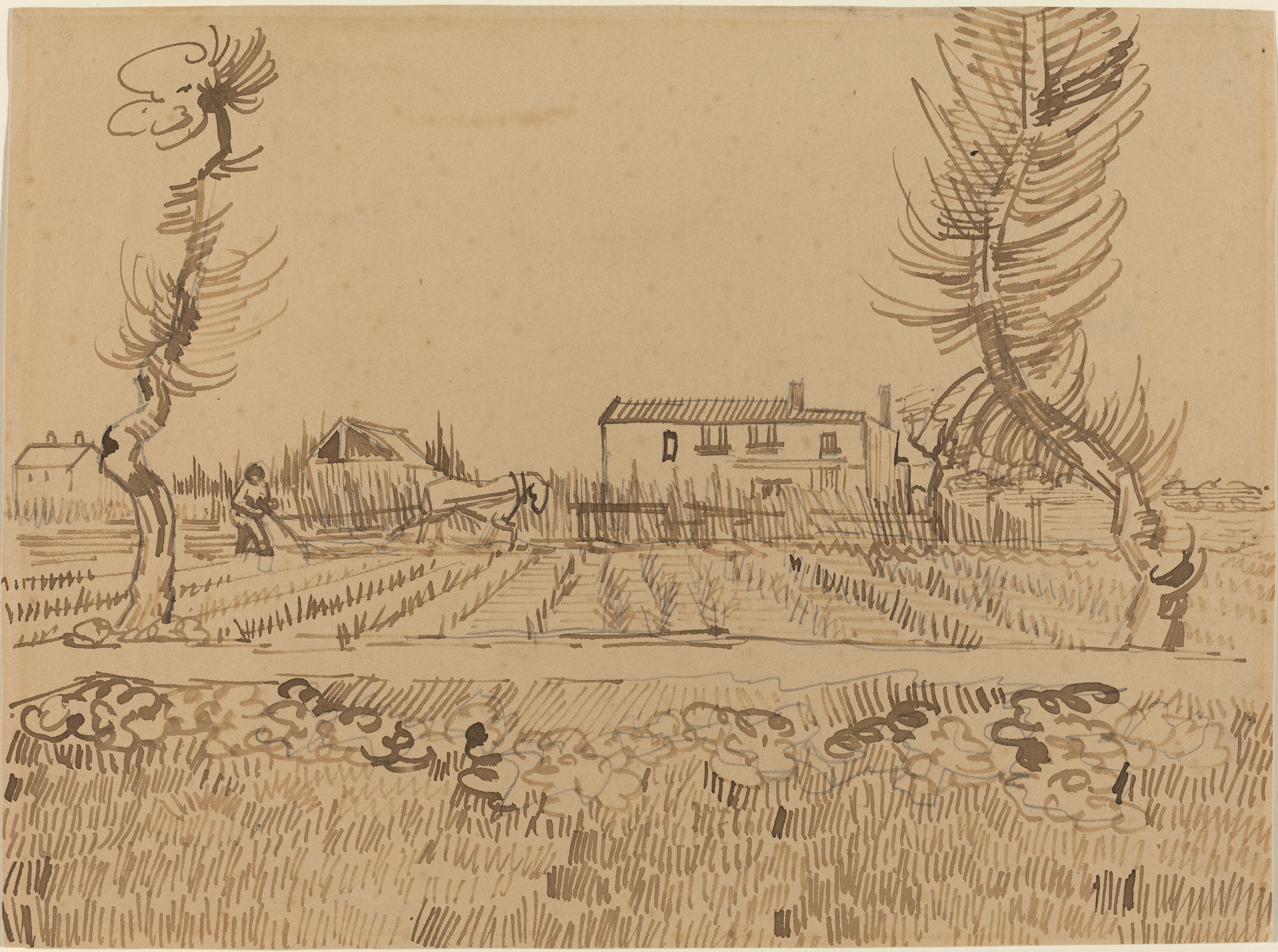
Vincent Van Gogh, Ploughman in the Fields near Arles, 1888, National Gallery of Art, Washington, D.C.

Although quill pens had largely replaced reed pens by medieval times, from time to time, the powerful strokes produced by the reed pen have been preferred by modern artists. Until the end of the 19th century, most art was commissioned by wealthy patrons or by institutions such as the church. As such, more traditional depictions of accepted themes were both the most popular and widely accepted. During the 19th century, social and cultural changes were reflected in literature and art. With this, artists began to explore different ways to express their vision and create their own personal style. Artist Vincent van Gogh made use of the strong stroke and accent of the reed pen, combining it with brown ink and graphite, to create a drawing of a different style.

== See also ==
- Penknife
- Qalam, Arabian reed pen
- List of pen types, brands and companies

== Sources ==
- "Calamus". The Encyclopædia Britannica: A Dictionary of Arts, Sciences and General Literature: New Maps and Many Original American Articles by Eminent Authors. With New American Supplement. Werner Company. 1897.
- Humphreys, Henry Noel (1855). The Origin and Progress of the Art of Writing: A Connected Narrative of the Development of the Art in Its Primeval Phases in Egypt, China, and Mexico ... and Its Subsequent Progress to the Present Day. Day and Son.
