= Parthenope (mythology) =

In Greek mythology, Parthenope (Ancient Greek: Παρθενόπη, romanized: Parthenopē, lit. 'maiden-voiced') may refer to the following personages:

- Parthenope, mother of Europa and Thraike by Oceanus, Titan of the great world-encircling river.
- Parthenope, one of the Sirens.
- Parthenope, an Arcadian princess as daughter of King Stymphalus. She consorted with Heracles and had by him a son Everes.
- Parthenope, a Lelegian princess as daughter of King Ancaeus of Samos and Samia, daughter of Meander, one of the river gods. She consorted with Apollo and had a son Lycomedes.
