= Libu =

Ancient Libyan tribe of Berber origin

Libu in hieroglyphs
r Z1 b w T14 A1 Z2
rbw

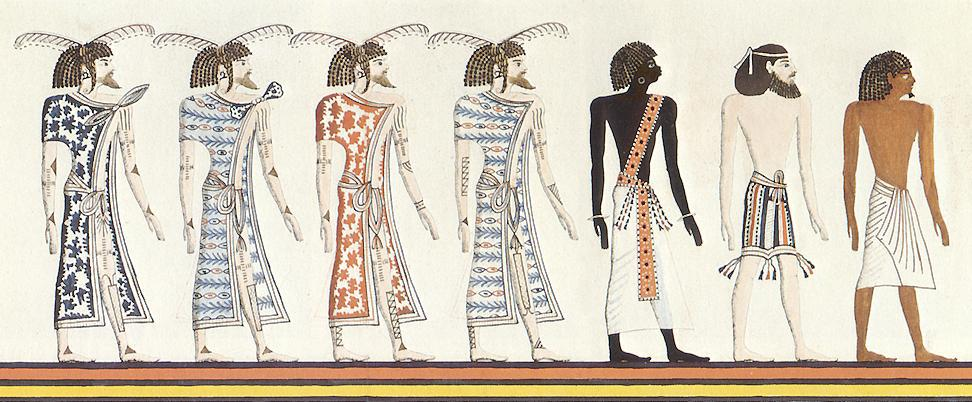
From right to left an Egyptian, an Assyrian, a Nubian, and four Libu men, Heinrich von Minutoli (1820)

The Libu (Ancient Egyptian: rbw; also transcribed Rebu, Libo, Lebu) were an Ancient Libyan tribe of Berber origin, from which the name Libya derives.

== Early history ==
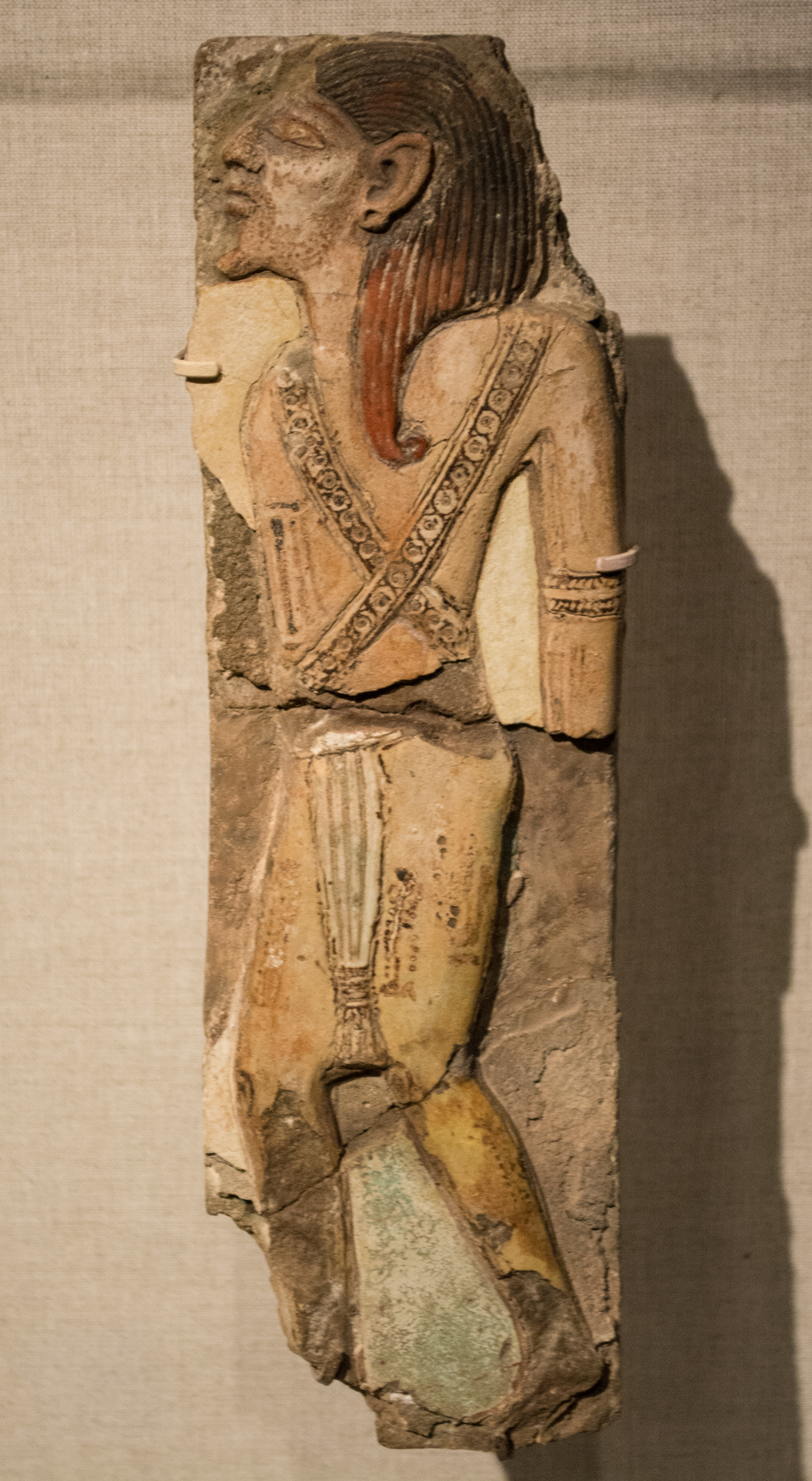
A faience tile from the throne of Pharaoh Ramesses III depicting a tattooed ancient Libyan chief (c. 1184 to 1153 BC).

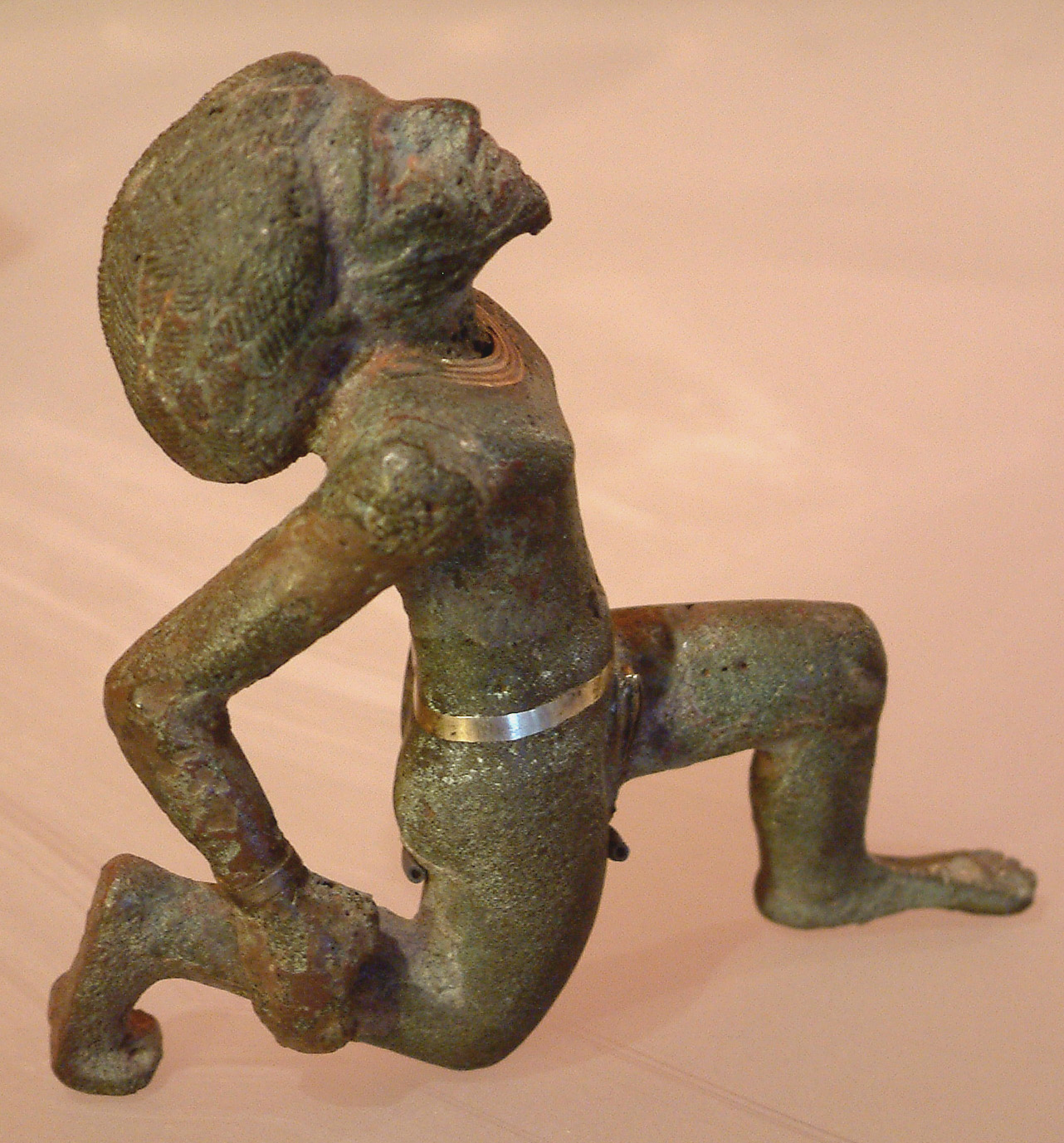
Vanquished Libyan. Bronze inlaid with gold and silver, reign of Rameses II (19th Dynasty) 1279–1213 BCE. (Louvre Museum, Paris)

Their tribal origin in ancient Libya is first attested in Egyptian language texts from the New Kingdom of Egypt, especially from the XXth dynasty. The earliest occurrence is in a Ramesses II inscription.

There were no vowels in the Egyptian script. The name Libu is written as rbw in Egyptian hieroglyphs. In the Great Karnak Inscription, the pharaoh Merneptah describes the Libu as men with pale complexion, tattooed, and with dark hair and eyes.

Hostilities between Egypt and Libya broke out in regnal year 5 (1208 BCE), but the coalition of Libu and Sea Peoples led by the chief of the Libu, Meryey, was defeated. Libu appears as an ethnic name on the Merneptah Stele.

The vile chief of the Libu who fled under cover of night alone without a feather on his head, his feet unshod, his wives seized before his very eyes, the meal for his food taken away, and without water in the water-skin to keep him alive; the faces of his brothers are savage to kill him, his captains fighting one against the other, their camps burnt and made into ashes[.]

Ramesses III defeated the Libyans in the 5th year of his reign, but six years later the Libyans joined the Meshwesh, invaded the western Nile Delta, and were defeated once again.

This name Libu was taken over by the Greeks of Cyrenaica, who co-existed with them. Geographically, the name of this tribe was adopted by the Greeks for "Cyrenaica" as well as for northwestern Africa in general.

In the neo-Punic inscriptions, Libu was written as Lby for the masculine noun, and Lbt for the feminine noun of Libyan. The name supposedly was used as an ethnic name in those inscriptions.

== Great Chiefs of the Libu ==
In the Western Delta sometime during the Twenty-second Dynasty of Egypt a realm of the Libu flourished under the "Great Chiefs of the Libu". Those rulers soon formed a dynasty, and they often had local "Chiefs of the Ma(shuash)" as their subordinates. The dynasty culminated with the chiefdom of Tefnakht who, despite holding both the titles of "Great Chief of the Libu" and of "Chief of the Ma" at Sais, was more probably of Egyptian ethnicity rather than either Libu or Ma. Later, Tefnakht claimed for himself even the pharaonic titles, founding the 24th Dynasty.

Below lists the succession of the known "Great Chiefs of the Libu". They used to date their monuments following the regnal years of the contemporary pharaoh of the 22nd Dynasty.

Name	Image	Attested in regnal year...	Corresponding absolute datation	Notes
Inamunnifnebu		Year 31 of Shoshenq III	795 BCE	-
Niumateped		Year 4 of Shoshenq IV; Year 8 of Shoshenq IV; Year 10 of Shoshenq IV	BCE	Possibly two different rulers with the same name
Tjerpahati		Year 7 of Shoshenq V Year 15 of Shoshenq V	760 BCE; 753 BCE	Also known in literature as Tjerper or Titaru, son of Didi
Ker		Year 19 of Shoshenq V	749 BCE	-
Rudamun		Year 30 of Shoshenq V	738 BCE	-
Ankhhor		Year 37 of Shoshenq V Year ? of Shoshenq V	731 BCE ? BCE	Struggled against Tefnakht and was likely defeated by him
Tefnakht		Year 36 of Shoshenq V Year 38 of Shoshenq V	732 BCE; 730 BCE	-

== See also ==
- Ancient Egypt
- Ancient Libya
- Garamantes
- Meshwesh
