= Meshwesh =

Ancient Libyan tribe

Meshwesh in hieroglyphs
G20 SA A wA A SA A T14 A14A Z3
Mšwš.w / Mꜥ-šꜣ-wꜣ-šꜣ.w
Meshwesh

The Meshwesh (often abbreviated in ancient Egyptian as Ma) was an ancient Libyan tribe.

Early records of the Meshwesh date back to the Eighteenth Dynasty of Egypt from the reign of Amenhotep III (c. 1390 - 1350 BC). During the 19th and 20th dynasties (c. 1295 – 1075 BC), the Meshwesh were in almost constant conflict with the Egyptian state. During the late 21st Dynasty, increasing numbers of Meswesh began to settle in the Western Nile Delta region.They ultimately took control of the country during the late 21st Dynasty first under Osorkon the Elder. After an interregnum of 38 years, during which the native Egyptian kings Siamun and Psusennes II assumed the throne, the Meshwesh ruled Egypt throughout the 22nd and 23rd Dynasties under many pharaohs as Shoshenq I, Osorkon I, Osorkon II, Shoshenq III and Osorkon III.

== Libyan origins ==
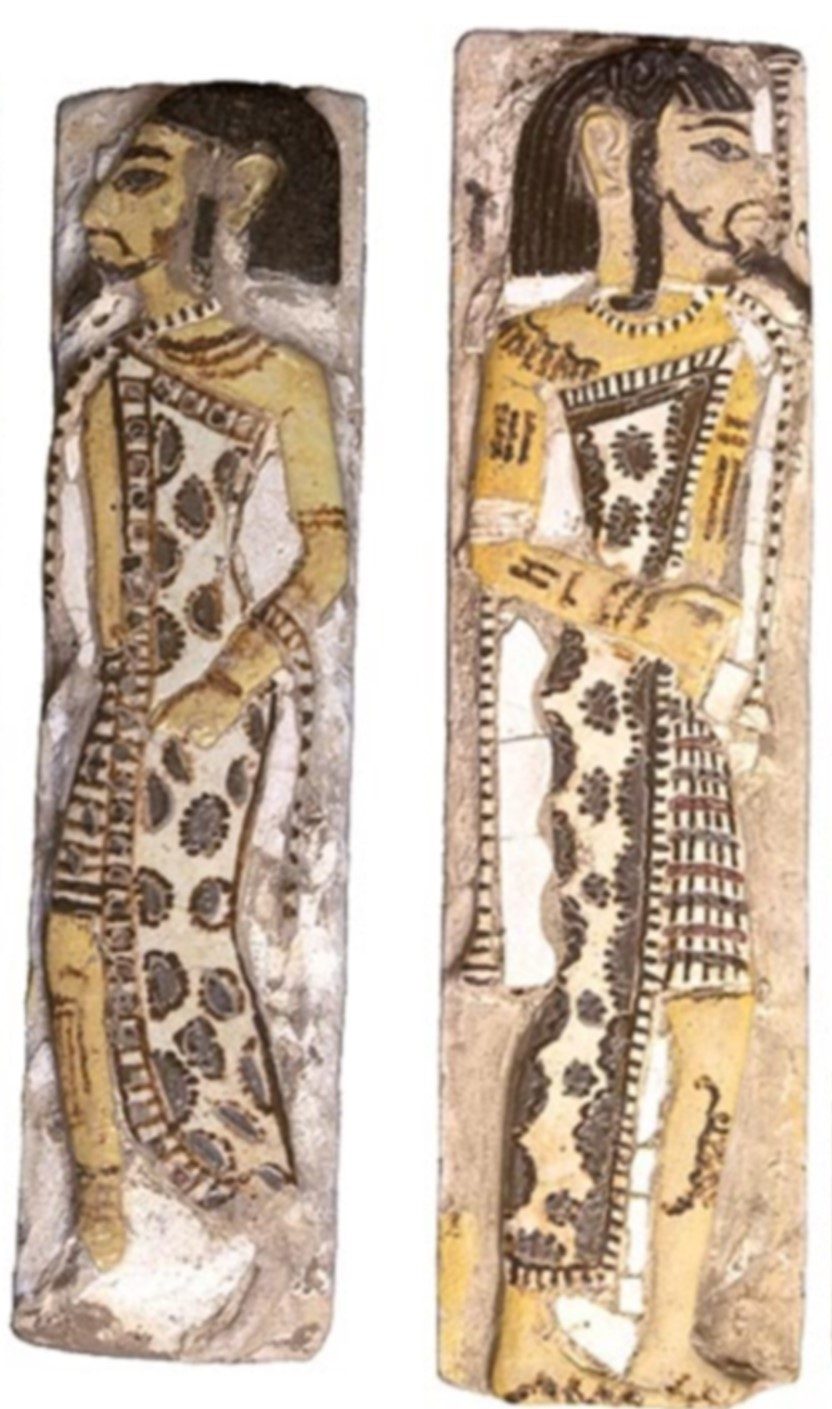
Ceramics of ancient Libyans from North Africa

That the Meshwesh were of Libyan origin is explicitly stated in a genealogy contained on the stela of Pasenhor (dated to the reign of Shoshenq V), where the great chiefs of the Meshwesh (including the kings of the 22nd Dynasty) are stated to be the descendants of "Buyuwawa the Libyan." The Libyo-Berber origin of the Meshwesh is also indicated in their personal names (such as Osorkon, Takelot, Nimlot, Shoshenq, etc.) and a handful of non-Egyptian titles used by these people that are related to the Berber languages. After the Egyptians, the Greeks, Romans, and Byzantines mentioned various other tribes in Libya. Later tribal names differ from the Egyptian ones but, probably, some tribes were named in the Egyptian sources and the later ones, as well. The Meshwesh tribe represents this assumption. Some scholars argue it would be the same tribe called Mazyes by Hecataeus of Miletus and Maxyes by Herodotus, while the tribe was called Mazices and Mazax in Latin sources.

== History ==
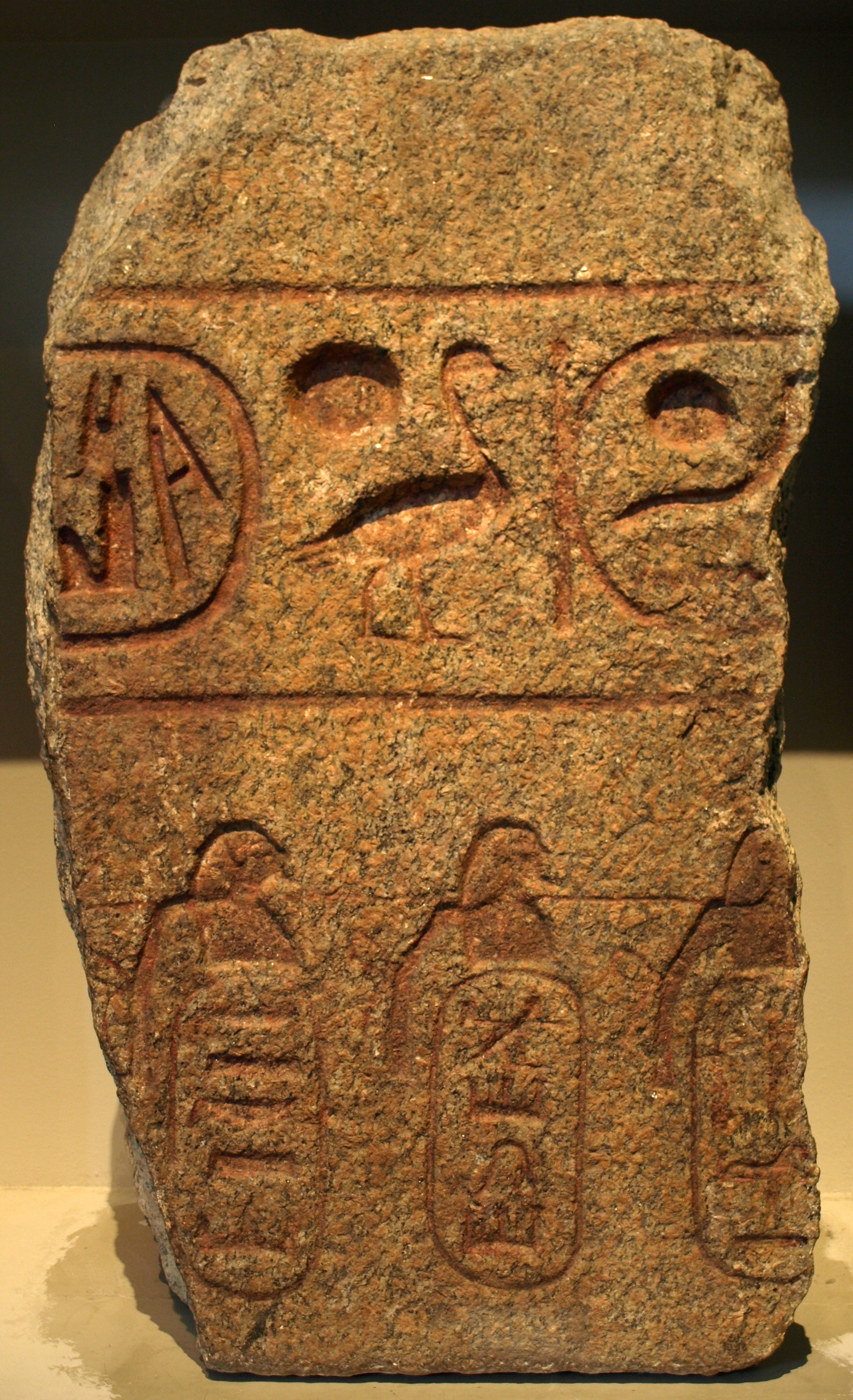
A stone block naming the Meshwesh (bottom row, middle) among foreign groups captured under Ramesses II

The Meshwesh are known from ancient Egyptian language texts as early as the Eighteenth Dynasty of Egypt, where they are mentioned as a source of cattle provided to king Amenhotep III's palace at Malkata. This indicates there may have been some trade relations between the Meshwesh and the Egyptians at the time. At the very least, it can be said that the Egyptians were familiar with the Meshwesh. For the remainder of the 18th Dynasty, information about Meshwesh or Libyans in general is sketchy. There are, however, representations of Libyans (perhaps Meshwesh) from the reign of Akhenaten, including a remarkable papyrus depicting a group of Libyans slaying an Egyptian. However, the papyrus is fragmentary, so the historical context is unknown. The Meshwesh or Ma were nomadic hunter-pastoralists, subsisting on goats, camels, and other livestock while also hunting and gathering. Milk, meat, hides, and wool were gathered from their livestock for food, tents and clothing.

The first ancient Egyptian sources described Meshwesh men with tattoos and long hair with longer side locks in the front, while centuries later they appear with shorter hair from Egyptian influence, but braided and beaded, neatly parted on both sides from their temples, and decorated with one or two feathers attached to leather bands around the crown of the head. They still used the same robes as before, a thin mantle of antelope hide, dyed and printed, crossing one of their shoulders and midcalf length, creating an open robe over a loincloth with an adorned penile sheath. The only exception was the new addition of a kilt above the knees and an animal tail in the manner of king Narmer and the penis adornment. Men wore facial hair trimmed except at their chins, and older men kept their longer chin tufts braided. Women wore the same robes as men, plaited and decorated their hair, and both genders wore heavy jewelry. Later images showed them dressed in tunics. Weapons included the bow and arrow, hatchets, spears, and daggers.

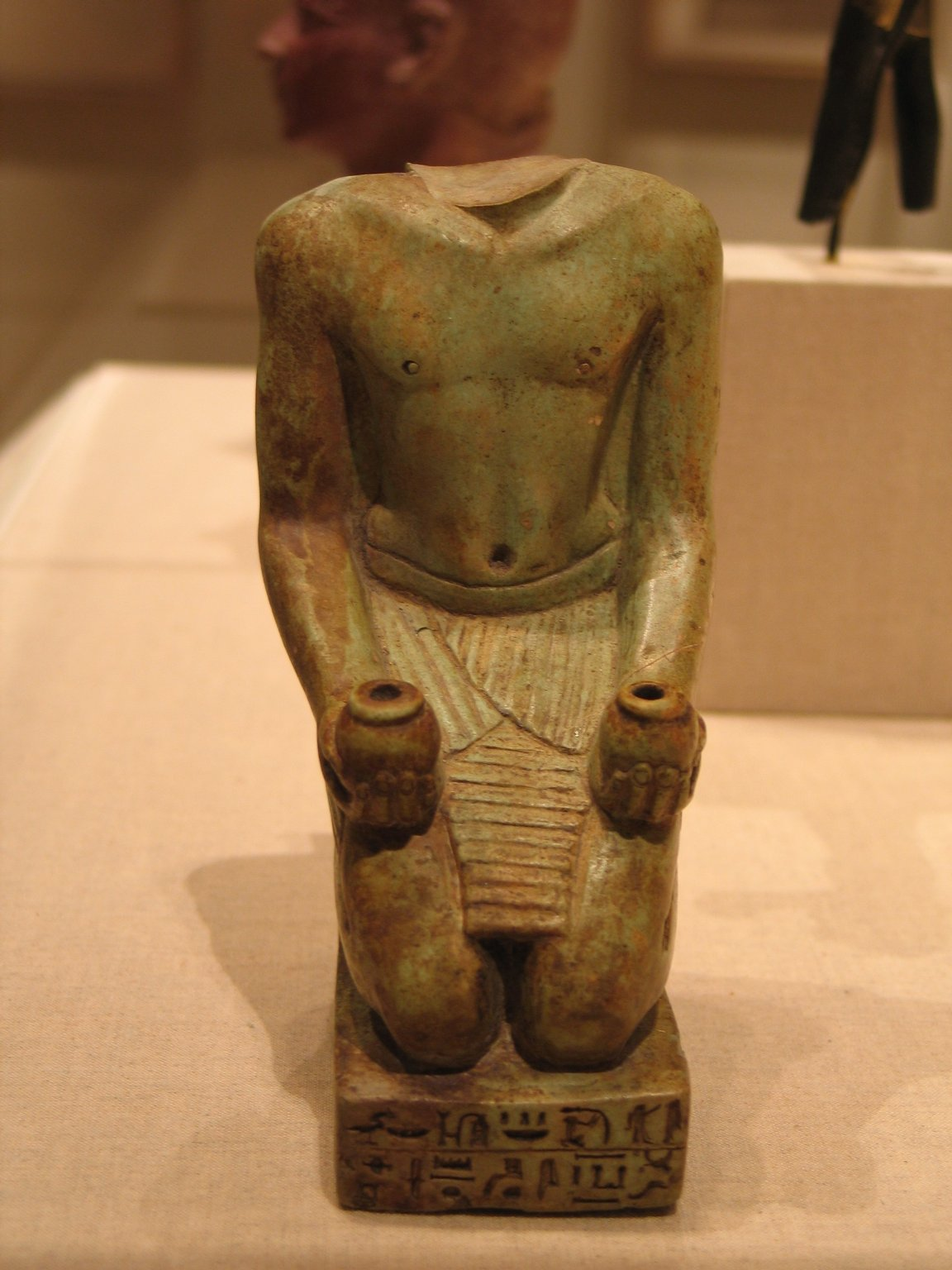
Kneeling statue of Nesbanebdjedet (V), "Great Chief of the Ma" at Mendes, ca. 755-730 BC. Brooklyn Museum

The relations between Libyans and the Egyptians during the Twentieth Dynasty were typically one of constant conflict. Battle reliefs at Karnak from the reign of Seti I depict the king in combat with Libyan masses; however, the text only describes the Libyans as being Tjehenu, one of the generic terms for "Libyan", rather than a specific tribal designation.

During the following reign, that of Ramesses II, the Egyptians constructed a series of coastal fortresses running west to the region of Marsa Matruh, including at el Alamein and Zawyet Umm El Rakham. The presence of these fortresses indicates a serious threat from the west, and Ramesses does claim to have overthrown the Libyans in various rhetorical texts. However, as with Seti I, he does not specify if Meshwesh were involved or not.

During the reign of Merneptah, the early-warning system had fallen into disrepair, as an unexpected Libyan invasion into the Nile Delta and oases of the Western Desert in Year 5 of his reign. Unlike his predecessors, Merenptah states in his battle reliefs at Karnak that it was primarily the Libu who led the conflict, but that Meshwesh and Sea People allies were also involved. Indeed, Merenptah claims that 9100 swords of the Meshwesh were captured. This conflict is also described on the Merneptah Stele.

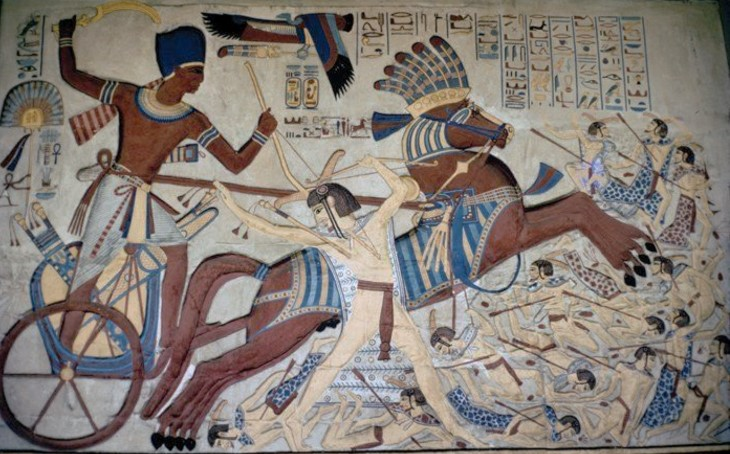
Ramesses III charging the Meshwesh

About twenty-five years later, during the reign of Ramesses III, the growing conflict between the Egyptians and Libyans came to a head. This time, it was the Meshwesh who instigated the conflict, though other Libyan tribes and their Sea People allies were involved in fighting two major campaigns against the Egyptian king, in Ramesses III's Regnal Years 5 and 11. The Year 11 campaign was primarily concerned with the Meshwesh, however. Ramesses claimed victory, and settled the Meshwesh in military concentration camps in Middle Egypt in order to assimilate them and impress them into military service for the state. According to Papyrus Harris I, Ramesses "settled [them] in strongholds of the Victorious King, they hear the language of the [Egyptian] people, serving the King, he makes their language disappear."

A text from the Third Intermediate Period mentions there being at least five "Fortresses of the Meshwesh" in the area of Herakleopolis Magna; these were probably the ones established by Ramesses. Throughout the Twentieth Dynasty, various texts on ostraca and papyri mention attacks by Meshwesh tribesmen as far south as Thebes, where the workmen of Deir el-Medina were forced to seek protection inside the mortuary temple of Medinet Habu.

During the late Third Intermediate Period, the Delta hosted the four great chiefdoms of the Meshwesh, each ruled by a "Great Chief of the Ma", whose seats of power were in the cities of Mendes, Sebennytos, Busiris and Per-Sopdu respectively; other lesser chiefdoms, led by a simple "Chief of the Ma", were located at Sais and Pharbaetus.

== See also ==
- Ancient Libya
- Libu
- Phut

== Sources ==
- Bates, Oric. 1914. The Eastern Libyans: An Essay. Cass Library of African Studies 87. London: Frank Cass and Company Limited. ISBN 0-7146-1634-6
- Dodson, Aidan Mark. 1995. "Rise & Fall of The House of Shoshenq: The Libyan Centuries of Egyptian History." KMT: A Modern Journal of Ancient Egypt 6 (3):52–67.
- Gomaà, Farouk. 1974. Die libyschen Fürstentümer des Deltas von Tod Osorkons II. bis zur Wiedervereinigen Ägyptens durch Psametik I. Tübinger Atlas des Vorderen Orients (Reihe B [Geistewissenschaften]) 6. Wiesbaden: Dr. Ludwig Reichert Verlag.
- Haring, Bernardus Johannes Jozef. 1992. "Libyans in the Late Twentieth Dynasty". In Village Voices: Proceedings of the Symposium 'Texts from Deir el-Medîna and Their Interpretation,' Leiden, May 31–June 1, 1991, edited by Robert Johannes Demarée and Arno Egberts. Centre of Non-Western Studies Publications 13. Leiden: Centre of Non-Western Studies, Leiden University. 71–80.
- Kitchen, Kenneth Anderson. [1996]. The Third Intermediate Period in Egypt (1100–650 BC). 3rd ed. Warminster: Aris & Phillips Limited.
- Leahy, M. Anthony. 1985. "The Libyan Period in Egypt: An Essay in Interpretation." Libyan Studies 16:51–65.
- ———, ed. 1990. Libya and Egypt c1300–750 BC. London: School of Oriental and African Studies, Centre of Near and Middle Eastern Studies, and The Society for Libyan Studies.
- Snape, Steven. 2003. "The Emergence of Libya on the Horizon of Egypt". In Mysterious Lands, edited by David B. O'Connor and Stephen G. J. Quirke. Encounters with Ancient Egypt 5. London: Institute of Archaeology, University College London and UCL Press. 93–106.
- Wainwright, Geoffrey Avery. 1962. "The Meshwesh." Journal of Egyptian Archæology 48:89–99.
- White, Donald. 1994. "Before the Greeks Came: A Survey of the Current Archaeological Evidence for the Pre-Greek Libyans." Libyan Studies 25 (Cyrenaican Archaeology: An International Colloquium):31–39, 43–44.
- Yoyotte, Jean. 1961. "Les principautés du Delta au temps de l'anarchie libyenne (Études d'histoire politique)". In Mélanges Maspero. Volume 1: Orient ancien. Mémoires publiés par les membres de l'Institut français d'archéologie orientale du Caire 66/1 (fascicle 4). Cairo: Imprimerie de l'Institut français d'archéologie orientale du Caire. 121–181.
