= Meander (mythology) =

Greek god of the Meander river in Caria

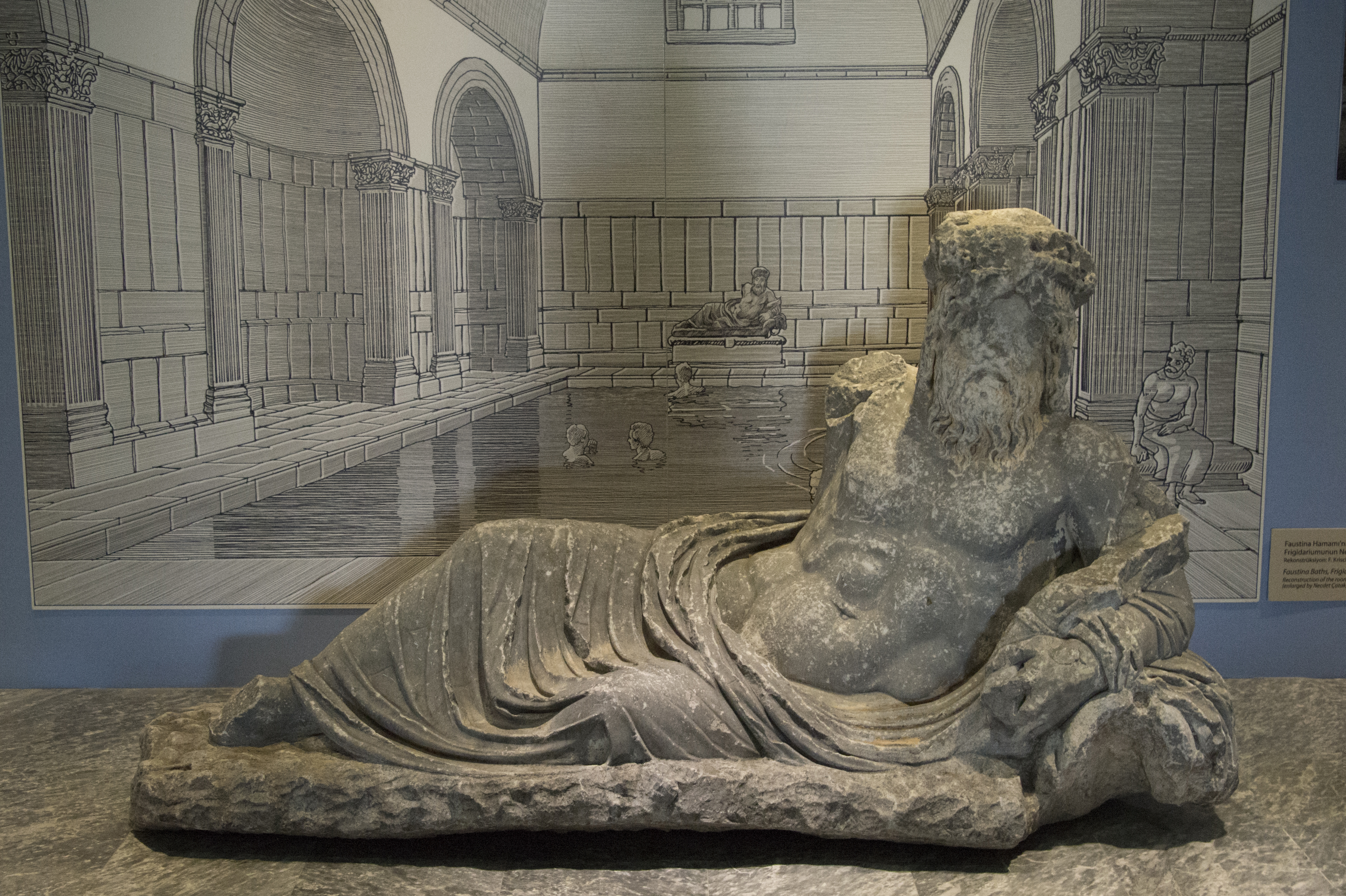
Roman statue of the river-god Meander from the Faustina Baths of Miletus, now in Turkey.

Meander, Maeander, Mæander or Maiandros (Ancient Greek: Μαίανδρος, romanized: Maíandros) is a river god in Greek mythology, patron deity of the Meander river (now known as the Büyük Menderes River) in Caria, southern Asia Minor (modern Turkey).

== Family ==
He was one of the sons of the Titan Oceanus and his sister-wife Tethys. Meander was the father of Cyanee, Samia, Kalamos and Callirhoe.

== Mythology ==
In a story told by Pseudo-Plutarch, Maeander waged war against the Pessinuntines and vowed to the Mother of the Gods that on obtaining victory, he would sacrifice "the first that came to congratulate him for his good success". As it happened, the first people who greeted him on his return were his mother, his son, and his sister. He fulfilled his vow, but was so grief-stricken that he cast himself into the river, and thus the river Maeander got its name. In this version, Maeander is the son of Cercaphus and Anaxibia, rather than Oceanus and Tethys. Parallels to this myth are found in Idomeneus and Jephthah.
