= Thrace (mythology) =

Sorceress in Greek mythology

Thrace (/θreɪs/; Ancient Greek: Θράκη, romanized: Thrākē) or Thraike (Ancient Greek: Θρᾴκη, romanized: Thrāíkē, lit. 'to stir', 'to trouble' or 'to be fierce/ bold') in Greek mythology, was the eponymous heroine and sorceress of Thrace. She was the daughter of Oceanus and Parthenope, and sister of Europa. Some of her half-sisters were Asia and Libya.
