= Lycomedes (mythology) =

Name of multiple characters in Greek mythology

In Greek mythology, Lycomedes (/ˌlaɪkəˈmiːdiːz/; Ancient Greek: Λυκομήδης, romanized: Lykomēdēs, lit. 'counseling like a wolf', 'wolf-counsel' or 'planning/ ruling with the cunning of a wolf') may refer to several characters:

- Lycomedes, a king of Scyros and father of Deidamia, mother of Neoptolemus by Achilles.
- Lycomedes, a son of Creon, one of the Greek warriors at Troy; he was represented by Polygnotus in the Lesche at Delphi as wounded (supposedly by Agenor) in the wrist, in the arm and in the head.
- Lycomedes, son of Apollo and Parthenope, daughter of King Ancaeus of Samos.
- Lycomedes, a Cretan suitor of Helen.
