= Great Karnak Inscription =

Ancient Egyptian hieroglyphic inscription

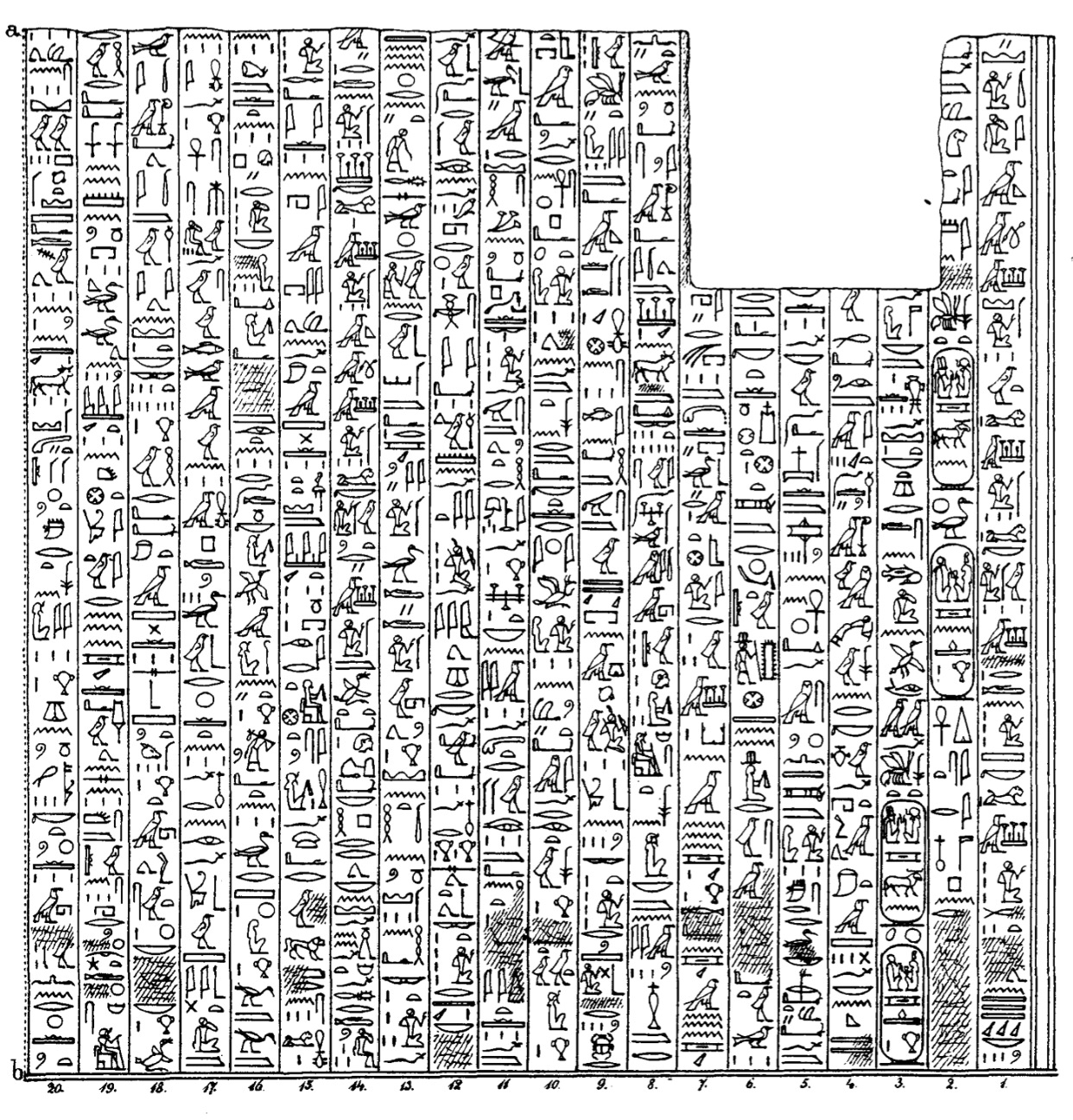
First part of the inscription (lines 1-20, out of 79)

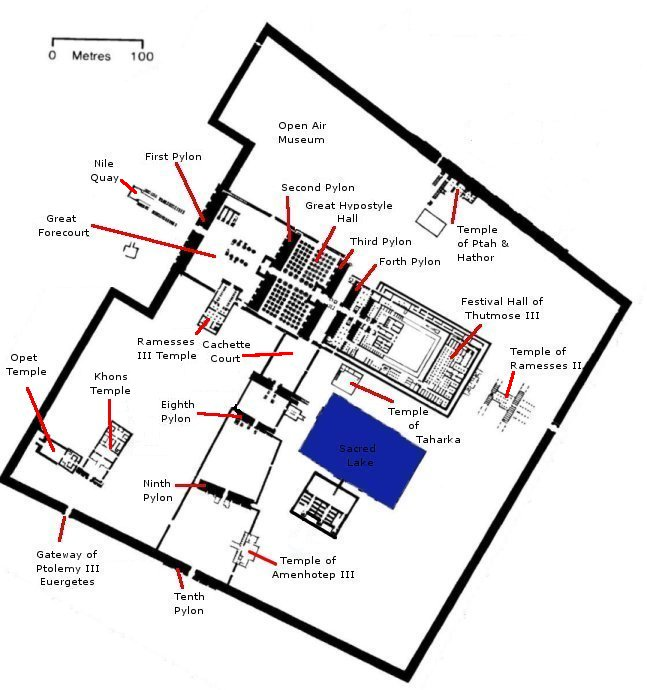
Location of Cachette court

The Great Karnak Inscription is an ancient Egyptian hieroglyphic inscription belonging to the 19th Dynasty Pharaoh Merneptah (reigned 1213-1203 BCE). A long epigraph, it was discovered at Karnak in 1828–1829. According to Wilhelm Max Müller, it is "one of the famous standard texts of Egyptology... [and has been] ... one of the greatest desiderata of scholars for many years."

The Great Karnak Inscription is located on the west (inside) of the east wall of the Cachette Court, in the Precinct of Amun-Re of the Karnak temple complex, in modern Luxor. It runs from the fourth pylon of the great sanctuary to the eighth pylon.

It was first identified by Champollion, and later partly published by Karl Richard Lepsius.

It includes a record of the campaigns of this king against the Sea Peoples in the Battle of Perire.

The 79-line inscription (which has now lost about a third of its content) shows the king's campaigns and eventual return with booty and prisoners.

It is the longest surviving continuous monumental text from Egypt.

It has been designated KIU 4246 by the Centre Franco-Égyptien d'Étude des Temples de Karnak.

== Bibliography ==
- Muller, Egyptological Researches
