= Zawyet Umm El Rakham =

Archaeological site in Egypt

- Location within Egypt
- 31°24′00″N 27°01′33″E
- Location: Egypt

Zawyet Umm El Rakham (Egyptian Arabic: زاوية أم الرخم lit. "the resthouse of the mother of vultures") is an archaeological site located on the North coast of Egypt 20 km to the west of Marsa Matruh, and about 300 km to the west of Alexandria

During the reign of Ramesses II, it was the location of a major fortress-town which probably marked the western extent of direct Egyptian influence.

It was discovered in 1948 and in the subsequent years was sporadically examined by Alan Rowe and Labib Habachi. Since 1994 extensive excavations have been undertaken at the site by a team from the University of Liverpool under the direction of Steven Snape.

The fortress is described by its texts as built on Libyan land, apparently to control the water resources in the area.
