= Bubastite Portal =

Inscribed gate in the Karnak Temple Complex

Coordinates: 25.71874°N 32.6574°E

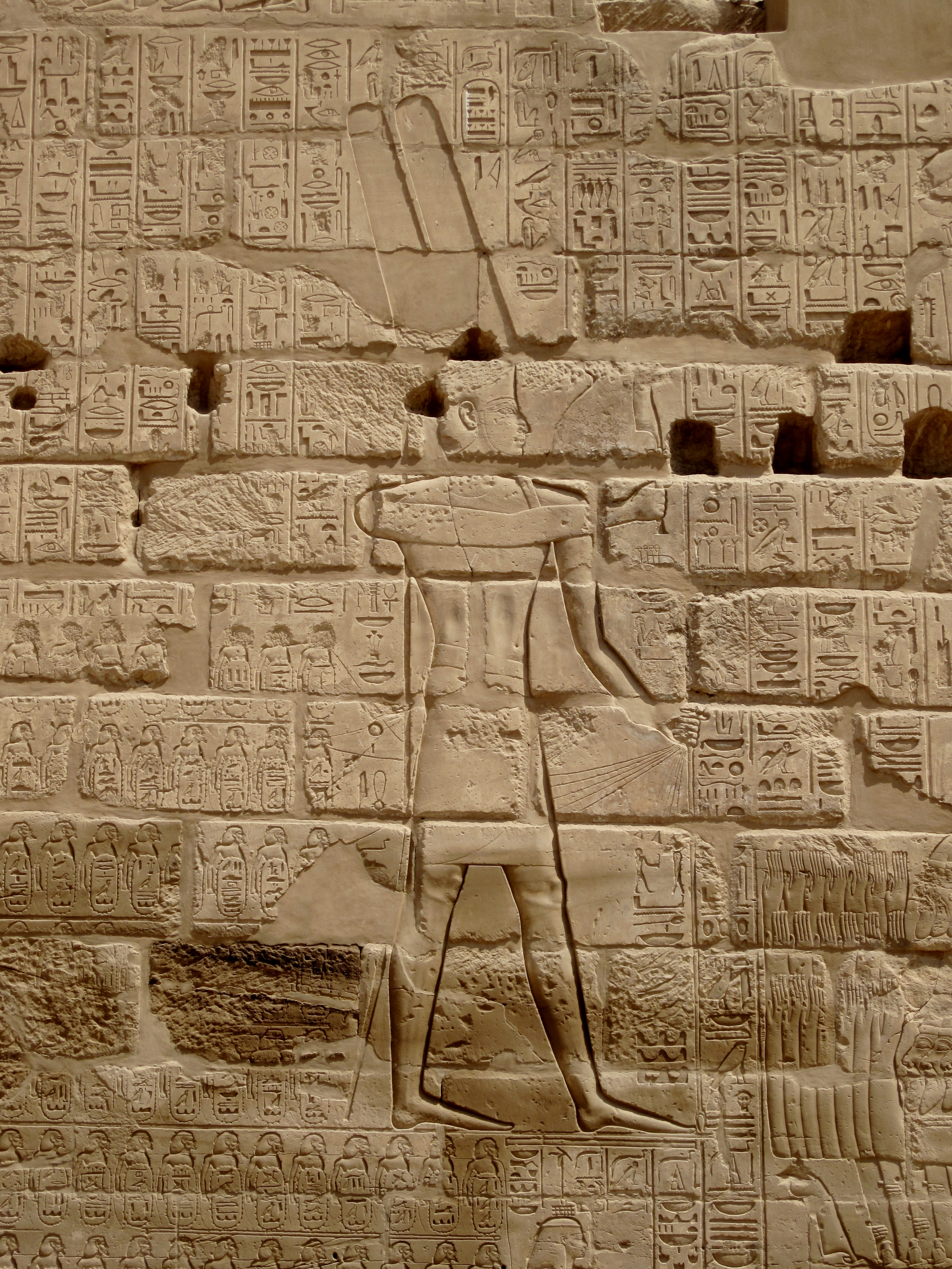
The temple wall depicts a list of city states conquered by Shoshenq I in his Near Eastern military campaigns.

The Bubastite Portal is a gate is located in Karnak, within the Precinct of Amun-Re temple complex, between the temple of Ramesses III and the second pylon. It records the conquests and military campaigns c. 925 BC of Shoshenq I, of the Twenty-second Dynasty. Shoshenq has been identified with the biblical Shishaq, such that the relief is also known as the Shishak Inscription or Shishaq Relief.

== History ==
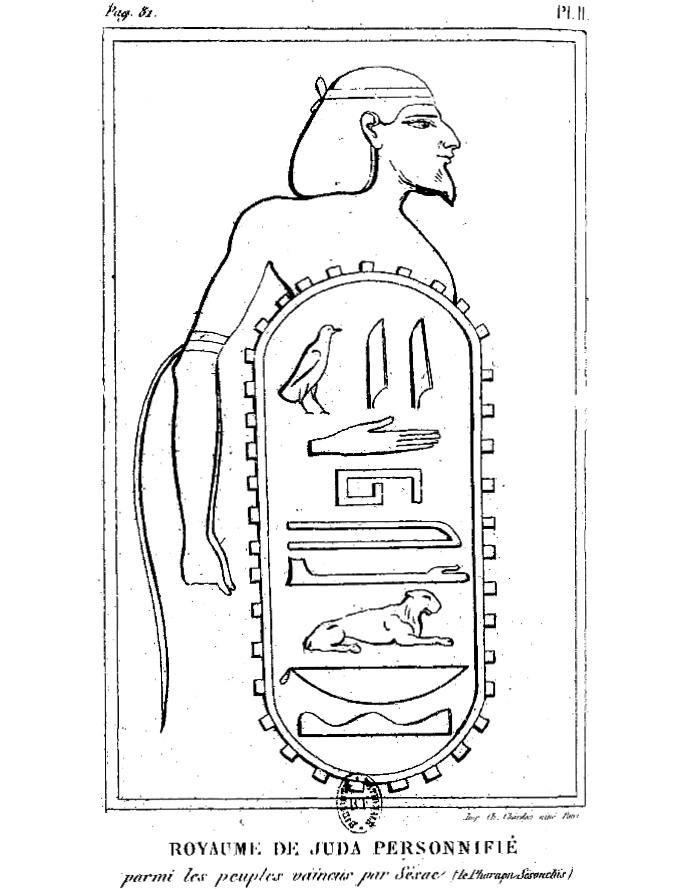
Champollion's 1829 drawing of a cartouche showing the name "ydhmrk". Champollion's 1829 read of this name as "King of Judah" has been discredited by modern scholars, who generally accept that the phrase refers to "Yad Hemmelek" ("Hand of the King"), although it has also been interpreted as "Juttah of the King"

This gate was erected by the kings of the Twenty-second Dynasty of Egypt, also known as the "Bubastite Dynasty". It is located to the south-east side of the Temple of Ramesses III.

Although Karnak had been known to Europeans since the end of the Middle Ages, the possible significance of the Bubastite Portal was not apparent prior to the decipherment of hieroglyphs. Jean-François Champollion visited Karnak in 1828, six years after his publication of the Rosetta Stone translation. In his letters he wrote:

"In this wonderful palace, I have contemplated the portraits of most of the old Pharaohs known for their great deeds, and these are true portraits.... one sees Mandoueï fighting the enemies of Egypt, and returning as triumphator to his homeland; farther along [in the series of images, one sees] the campaigns of Ramses-Sesostris; elsewhere, [one sees] Sésonchis hanging about at the feet of the Theban trinity (Amun, Mut and Khonsu), [and] the chiefs of more than thirty conquered nations, among which I found, as it should have been, fully spelled out, Ioudahamalek, "the kingdom of the Jews," or "[the kingdom] of Judah". There is in that [inscription] a commentary to connect to chapter 14 of the third book of Kings, which recounts in effect the arrival of Sésonchis (Sheshonq) at Jerusalem and his success [there]: thus, the identity that we have established between the Egyptian Sheschonck, the Sésonchis of Manetho and the Shishak or Scheschôk of the Bible is confirmed in the most satisfactory manner."

— Jean-François Champollion, Lettres ecrites d'Egypte et de Nubie en 1828 et 1829

== Description ==
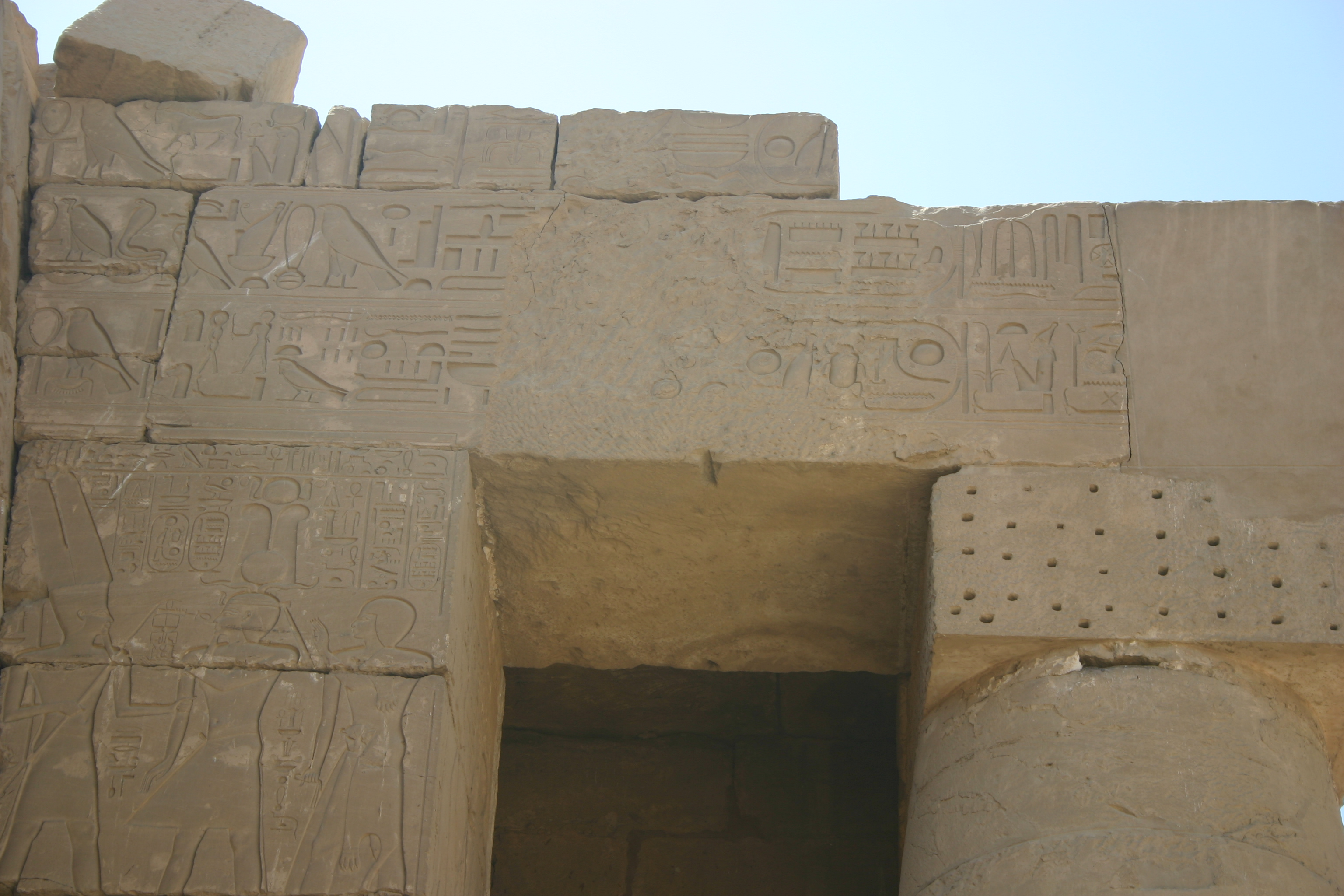
Portal showing cartouches of Shoshenq I

One facade shows King Shoshenq I, Takelot I, and Osorkon I of the Twenty-second Dynasty of Egypt making offerings to the gods and goddesses. Another scene shows Shoshenq grasping a group of captives by the hair and smiting them by his mace. Behind and below him are the names of Canaanite towns in several rows. Many of these are lost, but initially, there were 156 names, and one of the most exciting names mentioned is 'The Field of Abram.' The inscriptions give no details about this expedition and mention only the victory over the Asiatics (ꜥꜣm.w).

== Transliterations and translations ==
Below is a translation of the one hundred fifty-five names on the inscription.

=== Section One ===
Row I - Listing of the Nine bows
1. tꜣ rsy - Southern Land (i.e. Upper Egypt)
2. tꜣ mḥw = Northern Land (i.e. Lower Egypt)
3. jwn.tjw = Tribesmen
4. ṯhnw = Tjehenu
5. sḫt[-jꜣmw] - Field [of tents]
6. mn[.tjw] = Bedouin
7. pḏ[.tjw swt] = Bow[men of the feather]
8. šꜣt = Swamp (Upper Nubia)
9. ḥꜣ[.w-n]b.w = Northerners

=== Section Two - Coastal plain, Shephelah, Meggido plain and Jezreel plain ===
10. mj.tj ꜥ[r.t] = Copy of the [scroll]
11. g[...] = unknown
12. m[]ꜣ[] = Makkedah
13. rwbꜣ = Rubate

Row II
14. tꜣꜥnkj = Taanach
15. šꜣnmꜥ = Shunem
16. bꜣtšꜣn swr = Beth-Shean
17. rwꜣḫbꜣ = Rehob
18. ꜣḫpwrwm = Hapharaim
19. jdrw[m] = Adoraim (unknown locality in Israelite Kingdom, different from Adoraim in Judah)
20. (destroyed)
21. šꜣꜣwꜣd = unknown
22. mjꜣḥꜣnjmꜥ - Mahanaim
23. qbꜣꜥꜣnꜣ = Gibeon
24. bꜣtꜣḥwꜣrwn = Beth-Horon
25. qꜣdṯm = Kiriath-jearim or Gath-Gittaim
26. jywrwn = Aijalon

Row III
27. mjkdjw = Megiddo
28. jdrw = (Ataroth-)Addar
29. ywd-hꜥmrwk = Yad Hammelek ("hand of the king")
30. []rwt = unknown
31. ḥꜣjꜣnm = Henam
32. ꜥꜣrn = Aruna
33. bꜣrwmꜣꜥ = Borim
34. ḏꜣdpṯrw = Giti-Padalla
35. y[]hꜣ[]mꜣ = Yehem
36. bꜣtꜥꜣrwmmꜣ = Beth 'Olam
37. kꜣꜥqꜣrw = unknown
38. šꜣjwkꜣ = Socoh
39. bꜣttꜣpw = Beth-Tappuah

Row IV
40. jbꜣrjꜣ = unknown
41. [...]ḥtp = unknown
42. (destroyed)
43. (destroyed)
44. (destroyed)
45. bꜣtḏb[...] = unknown
46. nbk[...] = unknown
47. [...]i[...] = unknown
48. (destroyed)
49. (destroyed)
50. (destroyed)
51. [...]ssḏ[...] = unknown
52. (destroyed)

Row V
53. [p]nwjrw = Penuel
54. ꜣḥꜣdšꜣt = Hadashah?
55. pktṯ / pꜣ-wr-ktṯ = unknown / "The great ktṯ"
56. jdmjꜣ = Adam
57. ḏꜣ[m]rwmmꜣ = Zemaraim
58. [...]drw = Migdol
59. [...]rwḏꜣjꜣ = Tirzah
60. [...]nꜣrw = unknown
61. [...]j = unknown
62. (destroyed)
63. (destroyed)
64. [...]gꜣpn = unknown
65. pꜣ-ꜥmq = "The valley"

=== Section Three - Negev area ===
Row VI
66. ꜥꜣjꜣḏꜣj = Ezem
67. jnꜣrw = unknown
68. pꜣ ꜣḥqꜣrwj = "the fort"
69. ftjywšꜣj = Photis
70. jrhrwrw = Jehallel / El-Hallal
71. pꜣ ꜣḥqꜣrwj = "the fort"
72. mrbꜣrmj = unknown
73. šꜣbꜣrwṯ = "stream"
74. ngbꜣrwy = of (Ezion-)Geber
75. šꜣbꜣrwṯ = "stream"
76. wꜣꜣrkytj = unknown
77. pꜣ ꜣḥqꜣrwj = "the fort"
78. nꜥḏꜣytj = unknown
79. dd[ ]j = unknown
80. ḏꜣpꜣqj = Sapek
81. mj[]j[] = unknown
82. tꜣp[...] = unknown

Row VII
83. gꜣnꜣt = unknown
84. pꜣ nꜣgbw = "The Negev"
85. ꜥꜣḏꜣḥꜥṯ = unknown
86. tꜣšdnꜣw = unknown
87. pꜣ ꜣḥqꜣrw[t] = "the fort"
88. šꜣnꜣyj = unknown
89. hꜣqꜣ = unknown
90. pꜣ ng[bw] = "The Neg[ev]"
91. wꜣhṯrwwꜣk[...] = unknown
92. pꜣ nꜣgbw = "The Negev"
93. jšꜣḥtjw[t] = Shuhah?
94. pꜣ ꜣḥgrwj = "the fort"
95. ꜣḥꜣnnj = (Ben-)Hanan
96. pꜣ ꜣḥgrwj = "the fort"
97. jrwqꜣd = El-Gad
98. jdꜣmꜣmt = unknown
99. ꜣḥꜣnꜣny = (Ben-)Hanan

Row VIII
100. jdrj = Adar
101. pꜣ ꜣḥgrw = "the fort"
102. [ṯrwꜣ]ꜣn = Tilon?
103. ꜣḥydbsꜣ = "Highlands"?
104. šꜣrwnrwjm = Shaaraim
105. []y[...] = "Highlands"?
106. dwꜣꜣṯ = unknown
107. ꜣḥqrwjm = "forts"
108. ꜥꜣrwdjꜣt = Arad
109. [rwbꜣṯ] = "Great"
110. ꜥꜣrwdjt = Arad (Tel Malhata?)
111. nbꜣpꜣttṯ = unknown
112. yꜣrẖjm = Yeroham
113. [...]j = unknown
114. (destroyed)
115. (destroyed)
116. jd[...] = unknown

Row IX
117. [jdr...] = Adar
118. [...bꜣyj] = unknown
119. [...ḥgj] = unknown
120. []ꜣrywk = unknown
121. frwtjmjj = Peleth?
122. [ꜥ]tbꜣr = unknown
123. bpꜣjrwrḏꜣ = unknown
124. bꜣṯꜥnṯ = Beth-Anath
125. šꜣrꜣḥꜣn = Sharuhen
126. jrmꜥṯn = El-mattan
127. grwn = "threshing floor"?
128. jdꜣmꜣm = unknown
129. [...]rꜣḥṯ = unknown
130. [...]r = unknown
131. mꜥrw[...] = unknown
132. jrwr[...] = unknown
133. ywrwꜣ[...] = Yurza

Row X
134. (destroyed)
135. (destroyed)
136. (destroyed)
137. (destroyed)
138. (destroyed)
139. ywrḥm = Yehoram
140. jwnn = Onam
141. (destroyed)
142. ꜣg[...] = Unknown
143. (destroyed)
144. (destroyed)
145. mꜥ[...] = unknown
146. j[]d[...] = unknown
147. (destroyed)
148. (destroyed)
149. [...]ꜣ = unknown
150. ywrwdn = uncertain

Row X extension
1a. šꜣrwdd = unknown
2a. rpꜣḥ = Raphiah
3a. rwbn = Laban
4a. ꜥngrwn = unknown
5a. hꜣm = unknown

== Biblical narrative ==
The Biblical narrative recounts:

In the fifth year of King Rehoboam, because they had been unfaithful to the LORD, Shishaq king of Egypt came up against Jerusalem with 1,200 chariots and 60,000 horsemen. And the people were without number who came with him from Egypt— Libyans, Sukkiim, and Ethiopians. And he took the fortified cities of Judah and came as far as Jerusalem. Then Shemaiah the prophet came to Rehoboam and to the princes of Judah, who had gathered at Jerusalem because of Shishak, and said to them, "Thus says the LORD, 'You abandoned me, so I have abandoned you to the hand of Shishaq.'" Then the princes of Israel and the king humbled themselves and said, "The LORD is righteous." When the LORD saw that they humbled themselves, the word of the LORD came to Shemaiah: "They have humbled themselves. I will not destroy them, but I will grant them some deliverance, and my wrath shall not be poured out on Jerusalem by the hand of Shishaq. Nevertheless, they shall be servants to him, that they may know my service and the service of the kingdoms of the countries." So Shishaq king of Egypt came up against Jerusalem. He took away the treasures of the house of the LORD and the treasures of the king’s house. He took away everything. He also took away the shields of gold that Solomon had made, and King Rehoboam made in their place shields of bronze and committed them to the hands of the officers of the guard, who kept the door of the king’s house. And as often as the king went into the house of the LORD, the guard came and carried them and brought them back to the guardroom. And when he humbled himself the wrath of the LORD turned from him, so as not to make a complete destruction. Moreover, conditions were good in Judah.

The account of Shishak carrying off treasures from Jerusalem is thought by some scholars to be of dubious historicity; see Shishak § Biblical narrative.

== See also ==
- List of artifacts significant to the Bible
