= Stela of Pasenhor =

Ancient Egyptian limestone stela

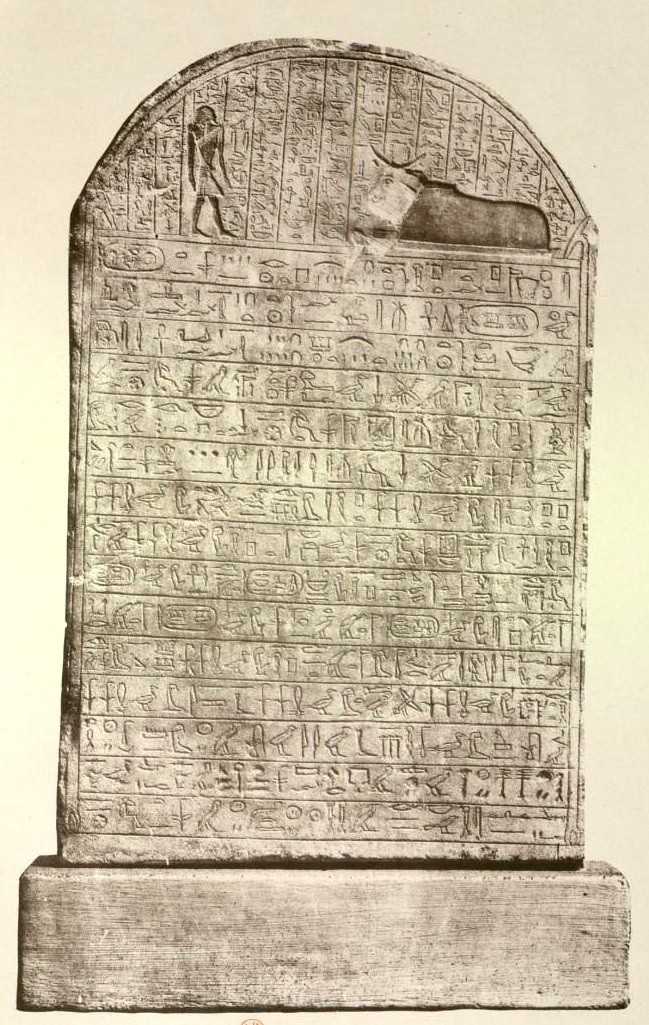
- The Stela of Pasenhor
- Material: Limestone
- Writing: Ancient Egyptian hieroglyphs
- Created: c.730 BCE
- Discovered: 1851; Saqqara
- Discovered by: Auguste Mariette
- Present location: Louvre Museum
- Identification: IM. 2846

The Stela of Pasenhor, also known as Stela of Harpeson in older literature, is an ancient Egyptian limestone stela dating back to the Year 37 of pharaoh Shoshenq V of the 22nd Dynasty (c.730 BCE). It was found in the Serapeum of Saqqara by Auguste Mariette and later moved to The Louvre, where it is still.

G5 G40 T22
Ḥrw-p3-sn
Pasenhor
in hieroglyphs
Era: 3rd Intermediate Period
(1069–664 BC)

The stela was intended to commemorate the death of an Apis bull occurred in this year and its author, the Priest of Ptah and Prophet of Neith, Pasenhor (B), was the performer of the funerary rites. Despite the commemorative nature of the stela, Pasenhor took the opportunity to inscribe his own genealogy on it.

The first part of the stela reflects its original purpose:

This god (i.e. the Apis) was introduced to his father Ptah (i.e. was "enthroned"), in the Year 12, fourth month of the second season, fourth day, of King Aakheperre Shoshenq (V), given life. He was born in the year 11 of his majesty; he rested in his place in Tazoser (i.e. was buried in the cemetery) in the year 37, third month of the first season, day 27, of his majesty. May he grant life, prosperity, health, and joy of heart to his beloved son, the prophet of Neith, Pasenhor.

After that, Pasenhor begins to trace back along his genealogy for sixteen generations, until about the end of the 20th Dynasty:

Buyuwawa “the Tehenu”
Mawasun; Great Chief
Nebneshi; Great Chief
Paihut(y); Great Chief
Shoshenq A Great Chief	Mehtenweskhet A
Nimlot A Great Chief; God's Father	Tentsepeh A
Shoshenq I	Karomama A
Osorkon I	Tashedkhonsu
Takelot I	Kapes
Osorkon II	Djedmutesankh
Nimlot C Chief of Herakleopolis	Tentsepeh C
Ptahudjankhef; Chief of Herakleopolis	Princess Tentsepeh D
Hemptah A Chief of Herakleopolis	Tjankemit
Pasenhor A Chief of Herakleopolis	Petpetdidies
Hemptah B Chief of Herakleopolis	Iretirou
Pasenhor B

Pasenhor's genealogy is quite important since he was a member of the royal family and could claim common ancestors with many pharaohs of the 22nd Dynasty. Thanks to the stela, we know more about the dynasty's origin and chronology, as well as the names of some otherwise unattested royal wives such as Karomama A, Tashedkhonsu and Kapes.

== See also ==
- Genealogy of Ankhefensekhmet

== Bibliography ==
- James Henry Breasted, Ancient Records of Egypt, volume IV: the Twentieth to the Twenty-sixth Dynasties, Chicago, The University of Chicago Press, 1906, § 785-792.
- Kenneth Kitchen, The Third Intermediate Period in Egypt (1100–650 BC), 1996, Aris & Phillips Limited, Warminster, ISBN 0-85668-298-5, § 85ff.
