= Nimlot B =

Ancient Egyptian prince

n mA r V13nm3rṯ
- Relatives: Shoshenq I (father); Patareshnes (mother)
- Military career
- Allegiance: 22nd Dynasty of Egypt (Shoshenq I)
- Rank: Commander of all the infantry

Nimlot B, also Nemareth (fl. c. 940 BCE) was an ancient Egyptian prince, general and governor during the early 22nd Dynasty.

== Biography ==
Nimlot was the third son of pharaoh Shoshenq I (after Osorkon I and Iuput A); his mother was the queen Patareshnes. He was appointed Commander of all the infantry by his father and was stationed in Herakleopolis Magna (around 940 BCE) which at the time was a strategic location for the control over Middle Egypt; Nimlot also served as governor of this town. He was very devoted to the local deity Heryshaf and he issued a decree ordering the restoration of the long lost practice of making a daily sacrifice of a bull for this god.
Nimlot B is further attested by a statue of unknown provenience now in the Kunsthistorisches Museum of Vienna (ÄS 5791), by two gold bracelets from Sais now at the British Museum (EA 14594-5) and by a kneeling naophore statue of him, found in 1905 by Ahmed Kamal at Leontopolis and now at the Cairo Museum (JE 37956).

His immediate predecessors and successors in the rule of Herakleopolis are unknown; the next known governor of the city was Nimlot C, who was in charge nearly a century later.

== Bibliography ==
- Kenneth Kitchen, The Third Intermediate Period in Egypt (1100–650 BC), 1996, Aris & Phillips Limited, Warminster, ISBN 0-85668-298-5
