= Karomama A =

- King's Wife, God's Mother
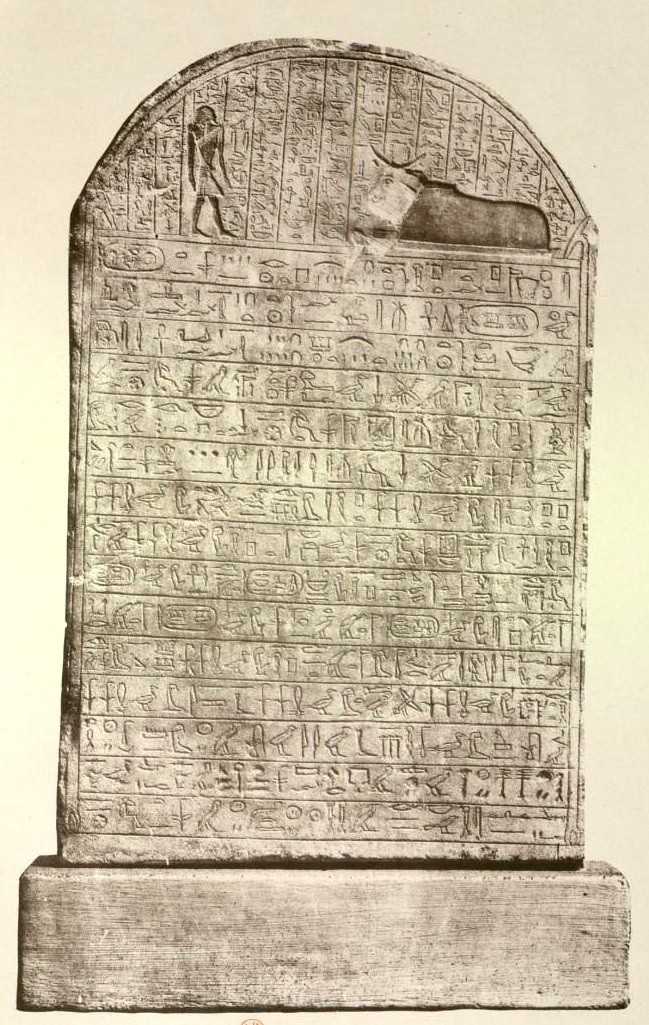
- The Stela of Pasenhor, the sole attestation for queen Karomama A
- Spouse: Shoshenq I
- Issue: Osorkon I
Egyptian name
< D28 Z1 r r a Aa13 Z1 a >
Krmm
Karomama
- Dynasty: 22nd Dynasty

Karomama (A), also known as Karamat, was an ancient Egyptian queen consort. She is only known from the stela of Pasenhor through which is known that she was the wife of pharaoh Shoshenq I and mother of pharaoh Osorkon I.
