= Nimlot A =

Great Chief of the Ma

- Great Chief of the Ma
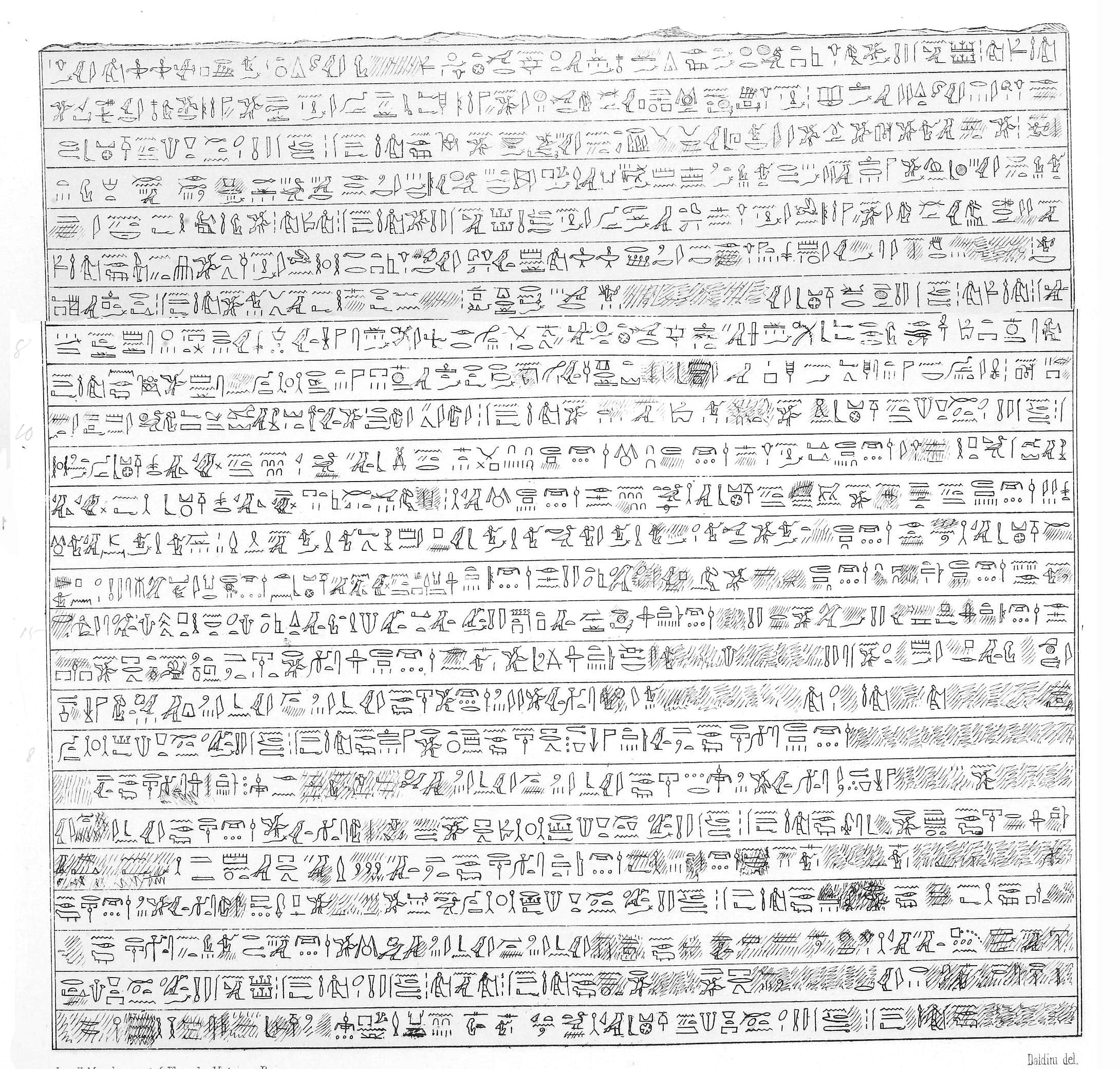
- The inscription which Shoshenq dedicated to his father Nimlot A at Abydos
- Predecessor: Shoshenq A
- Successor: Shoshenq B (= Shoshenq I)
- Dynasty: 21st Dynasty
- Pharaoh: Osorkon the Elder, Siamun, Psusennes II
- Spouse: Tentsepeh A
- Father: Shoshenq A
- Mother: Mehtenweskhet A
- Children: Shoshenq I, Mehtenweskhet B?

Nimlot A was a Great Chief of the Ma during the late 21st Dynasty of ancient Egypt. He is mainly known for being the father of the founder of the 22nd Dynasty, pharaoh Shoshenq I.

== Biography ==
Nimlot A was a son of the Great Chief of the Ma Shoshenq A and of the King's mother Mehtenweskhet A, and thus a full-brother of the 21st Dynasty pharaoh Osorkon the Elder. His wife was Tentsepeh A by whom he had a son, Shoshenq B who later became pharaoh (Shoshenq I): for this reason Nimlot and Tentsepeh were posthumously called God's father and God's mother. It is probable that the couple also had a daughter, Mehtenweskhet B, who married the High Priest of Ptah Shedsu-nefertum.

When Nimlot A died, his son Shoshenq inherited the title of Great Chief of the Ma; Shoshenq obtained by pharaoh Psusennes II the permission to build at Abydos a great dedicatory inscription in honor of his father. Nimlot A and Tentsepeh A are also mentioned in the genealogy reported on the stela of Pasenhor.

Shoshenq A Great Chief	Mehtenweskhet A
Osorkon the Elder	Nimlot A Great Chief; God's Father	Tentsepeh A
Shoshenq I	Mehtenweskhet B	Shedsu-nefertum; High Priest of Ptah
