= Osorkon the Elder =

Egyptian pharaoh

- Osochor
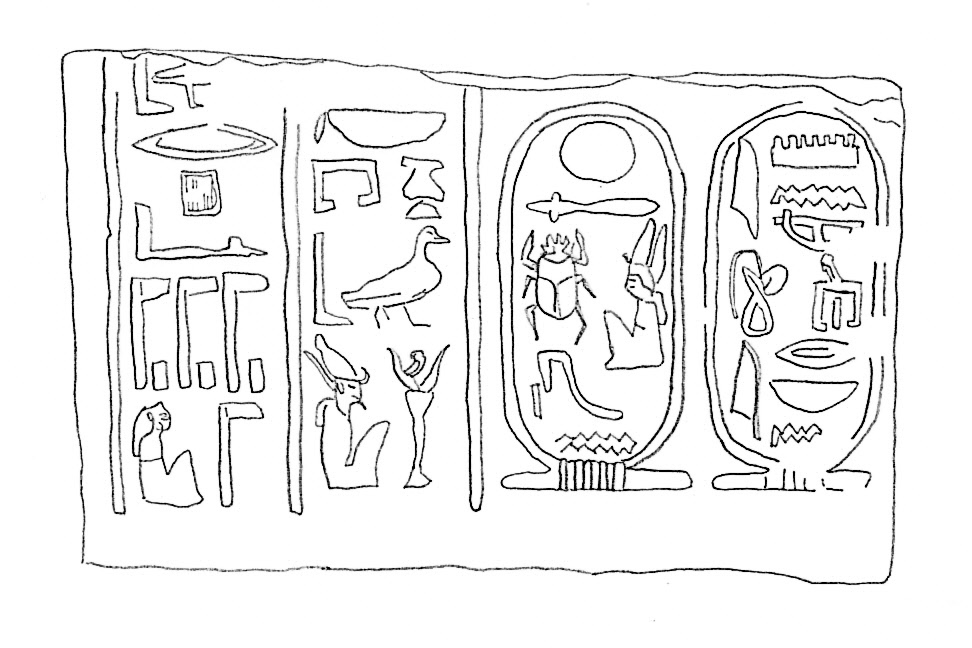
- Block-relief attributed to Osorkon the Elder

Pharaoh
- Reign: 991 – 985 BC
- Predecessor: Amenemope
- Successor: Siamun
Royal titulary
Prenomen
Aakheperre Setepenre
ˁȝ-ḫpr-rˁ-stp-n-rˁ
Great is the manifestation of Ra, the chosen one of Ra
M23 t L2 t < N5 O29 L1 N5 U21 n >
Aakheperre Setepenamun
ˁȝ-ḫpr-rˁ-stp-n-Jmn
Great is the manifestation of Ra, the chosen one of Amun
M23 t L2 t < N5 O29 L1 C12 U21 n >
Nomen
Osorkon Meryamun
Wsr.kn mrj Jmn
Osorkon, beloved of Amun
< mn n U7 i Aa18 V4 r V31 n i >
- Children: possibly Karimala
- Father: Shoshenq A
- Mother: Mehtenweshkhet A
- Died: 985 BC
- Dynasty: 21st Dynasty

Aakheperre Setepenre Osorkon, also known as Osorkon the Elder, was the fifth king of the 21st Dynasty of Ancient Egypt and was the first Pharaoh of Meshwesh (Ancient Libyan) origin. He is also sometimes known as Osochor, following Manetho's Aegyptiaca.

== Biography ==
Osorkon the Elder was the son of Shoshenq A, the Great Chief of the Ma by the latter's wife Mehtenweshkhet A who is given the prestigious title of 'King's Mother' in a document. Osorkon was the brother of Nimlot A, the Great Chief of the Ma, and Tentshepeh A the daughter of the Great Chief of the Ma and, thus, an uncle of Shoshenq I, founder of the 22nd Dynasty. His existence was doubted by most scholars until Eric Young established in 1963 that the induction of a temple priest named Nespaneferhor in Year 2 I Shemu day 20 under a certain king named Aakheperre Setepenre—in fragment 3B, line 1-3 of the Karnak Priest Annals —occurred one generation prior to the induction of Hori, Nespaneferhor's son, in Year 17 of Siamun, which is also recorded in the same annals. Young argued that this king Aakheperre Setepenre was the unknown Osochor. This hypothesis was not fully accepted by all Egyptologists at that time, however.

Then, in a 1976–77 paper, Jean Yoyotte noted that a Libyan king named Osorkon was the son of Shoshenq A by the Lady Mehtenweshkhet A, with Mehtenweshkhet being explicitly titled the "King's Mother" in a certain genealogical document. Since none of the other kings named Osorkon had a mother named Mehtenweshkhet, it was conclusively established that Aakheperre Setepenre was indeed Manetho's Osochor, whose mother was Mehtenweshkhet. The Lady Mehtenweshkhet A was also the mother of Nimlot A, Great Chief of the Meshwesh and, thus, Shoshenq I's grandmother.

In 1999, Chris Bennett made a case for a Queen Karimala known from an inscription in the temple of Semna being his daughter. She is called both 'King's Daughter" and "King's Wife". Her name suggests she may have been Libyan. Given the date of the inscription (a year 14), she might have been the queen of either king Siamun or king Psusennes II. Bennett prefers a marriage to Siamun, because in that case she could have taken over the position of the Viceroy of Kush, Neskhons, as a religious figurehead in Nubia after the death of the latter in year 5 of king Siamun.

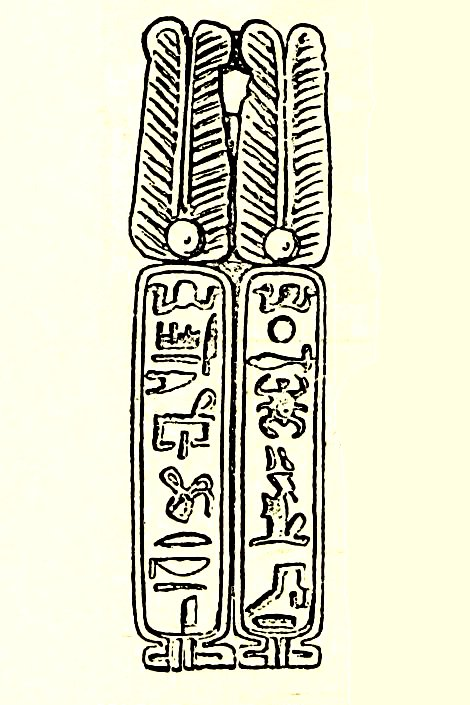
Seal with royal cartouches, attributed to Osorkon the Elder

A faience seal and a block naming a king Osorkon with the names Aakheperre Setepenamun, Osorkon Meryamun, both in the Rijksmuseum van Oudheden in Leiden, were for a long time attributed to Osorkon IV; however, this attribution has been challenged by Frederic Payraudeau in 2000, who pointed out that those objects more likely referred to Osorkon the Elder. This would lead to the attribution to his throne name Aakheperre both the epithets Setepenre and Setepenamun.

== Osorkon's time-line ==
Based on a calculation of the aforementioned Year 2 lunar date of this king – which Rolf Krauss in an astronomical calculation has shown to correspond to 990 BC – Osorkon the Elder must have become king two years before the induction of Nespaneferhor in 992 BC.

Osorkon the Elder's reign is significant because it foreshadows the coming Libyan 22nd Dynasty. He is credited with a reign of six years in Manetho's Aegyptiaca and was succeeded in power by Siamun, who was either Osorkon's son or an unrelated native Egyptian.
