= Harsiese A =

Egyptian ruler (1000–0860)

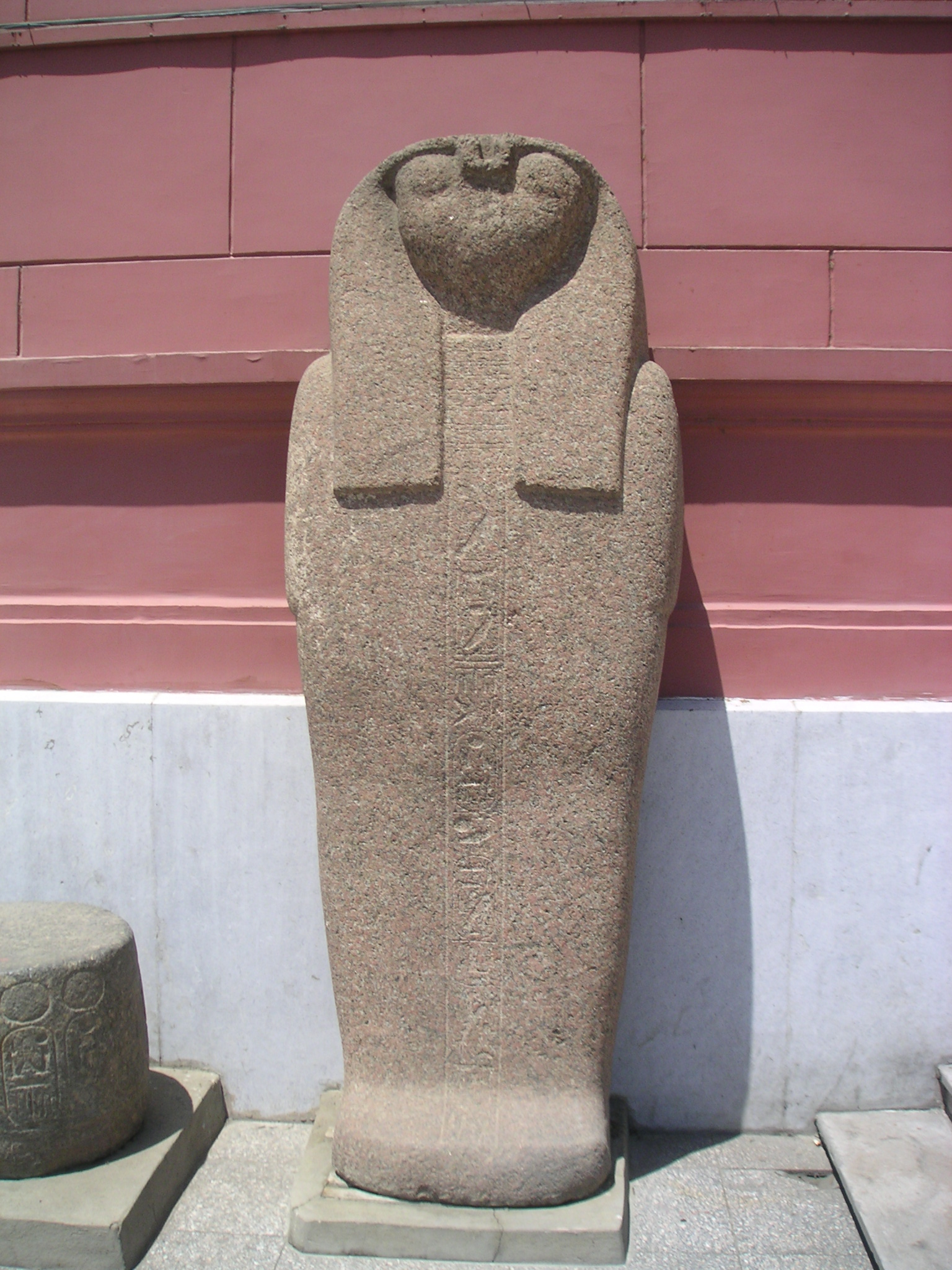
- Sarcophagus of king Harsiese A

King of Thebes
- Reign: 880–860 BC
- Successor: Takelot II, not immediate
Royal titulary
Horus name
Kanakht Khaemwaset
kꜣ-nḫt-ḫˁj-m-wꜣst
"Strong bull who appears in Thebes"
G5	E2 D40 N28 m R19
Prenomen
Hedjkheperre Setepenamun
ḥḏ-ḫpr-Rˁ stp.n-Jmn
"Radiant manifestation of Ra, the chosen one of Amun"
M23 t L2 t < ra S1 xpr i mn n stp n >
Nomen
Horsaiset Meriamum
Ḥr-zꜣ-ꜣst mrj-Jmn
Harsiese, lit."Horus, son of Isis, beloved of Amun"

G39 N5	i mn n N36 G5 H8 Z1 Q1 X1 H8
- Children: [Pe]du[bast], possibly Pedubast I Isetweret i Tadittanebethen
- Father: Shoshenq Q
- Mother: Nesitanebetasheru B
- Burial: tomb at Medinet Habu
- Dynasty: 23rd Dynasty

King Hedjkheperre Setepenamun Harsiese, or Harsiese A, is viewed by the Egyptologist Kenneth Kitchen in his Third Intermediate Period of Egypt to be both a High Priest of Amun and the son of the High Priest of Amun, Shoshenq Q. The archaeological evidence does suggest that he was indeed Shoshenq Q's son. However, recent published studies by the German Egyptologist Karl Jansen-Winkeln in JEA 81 (1995) have demonstrated that all the monuments of the first (king) Harsiese show that he was never a High Priest of Amun in his own right. Rather both Harsiese A and his son [...]du[...] – whose existence is known from inscriptions on the latter's funerary objects at Coptos – are only attested as Ordinary Priests of Amun. Instead, while Harsiese A was certainly an independent king at Thebes during the first decade of Osorkon II's kingship, he was a different person from a second person who was also called Harsiese: Harsiese B. Harsiese B was the genuine High Priest of Amun, who is attested in office late in Osorkon II's reign, in the regnal year 6 of Shoshenq III and in regnal years 18 and 19 of Pedubast I, according to Jansen-Winkeln.

While Harsiese A may have become king at Thebes prior to Year 4 of Osorkon II, contra Kitchen, he certainly ruled Thebes during the first decade of Osorkon II's reign as Kitchen notes. Osorkon II's control over this great city is only first documented by two separate Year 12 Nile Level Texts, which means that Harsiese had died by this time. If Harsiese was already ruling at Thebes earlier under Takelot I, it might help explain why Takelot I's own Year 5, Year 8, and Year 14 Nile Level Texts, which mention the serving High Priests Iuwelot and Smendes III—who were all brothers of Takelot I--consistently omit any mention of Takelot's name, as Gerard Broekman aptly notes in an article in JEA (88 (2002)). Takelot I's name is left deliberately blank here. This might indicate a possible rivalry between Takelot I and Harsiese A at Thebes. The Amun Priests may have chosen not to involve themselves in this dispute by omitting any mention of the reigning king's name.

== Burial ==
His tomb was found during excavations at Medinet Habu in 1932.

According to a 1994 book by the English Egyptologist Aidan Dodson, King Harsiese:

was buried in a tomb within the temenos at Medinet Habu, in the trough of a granite coffin (JE 60137) made for Ramesses II's sister, Henutmire, (and) closed with a hawk-Headed lid. When cleared, four canopic jars were found....No trace of any lids have survived, suggesting that such items may have been of [perishable] wood[.](p.92)

Dodson notes that Harsiese's coffin is similar in style to the hawk-headed silver coffin of Shoshenq II, and to the surviving "traces of the gilded coffin and cartonnage of Osorkon II" (pp. 88–89).
