= Penreshnes =

- Queen consort of Egypt
- Spouse: Pharaoh Shoshenq I
- Issue: Nimlot B
- Dynasty: 22nd Dynasty of Egypt
- Religion: Ancient Egyptian religion

G40 N16 r S n z
Penreshnes
in hieroglyphs
Era: 3rd Intermediate Period
(1069–664 BC)

Penreshnes or Penreshnas was an ancient Egyptian secondary queen consort of pharaoh Shoshenq I, the founder of the 22nd Dynasty.

A daughter of an unnamed Libyan chief, her name perhaps means “our joy (pertains) to her”. Penreshnes borne prince Nimlot B who was later appointed Commander of all the infantry at Herakleopolis Magna by his father.

Penreshnes is known from a number of documents, particularly by a statue of his son of unknown provenience now in the Kunsthistorisches Museum of Vienna (ÄS 5791)
