= Smendes III =

Egyptian High Priest of Amun

- High Priest of Amun in Thebes
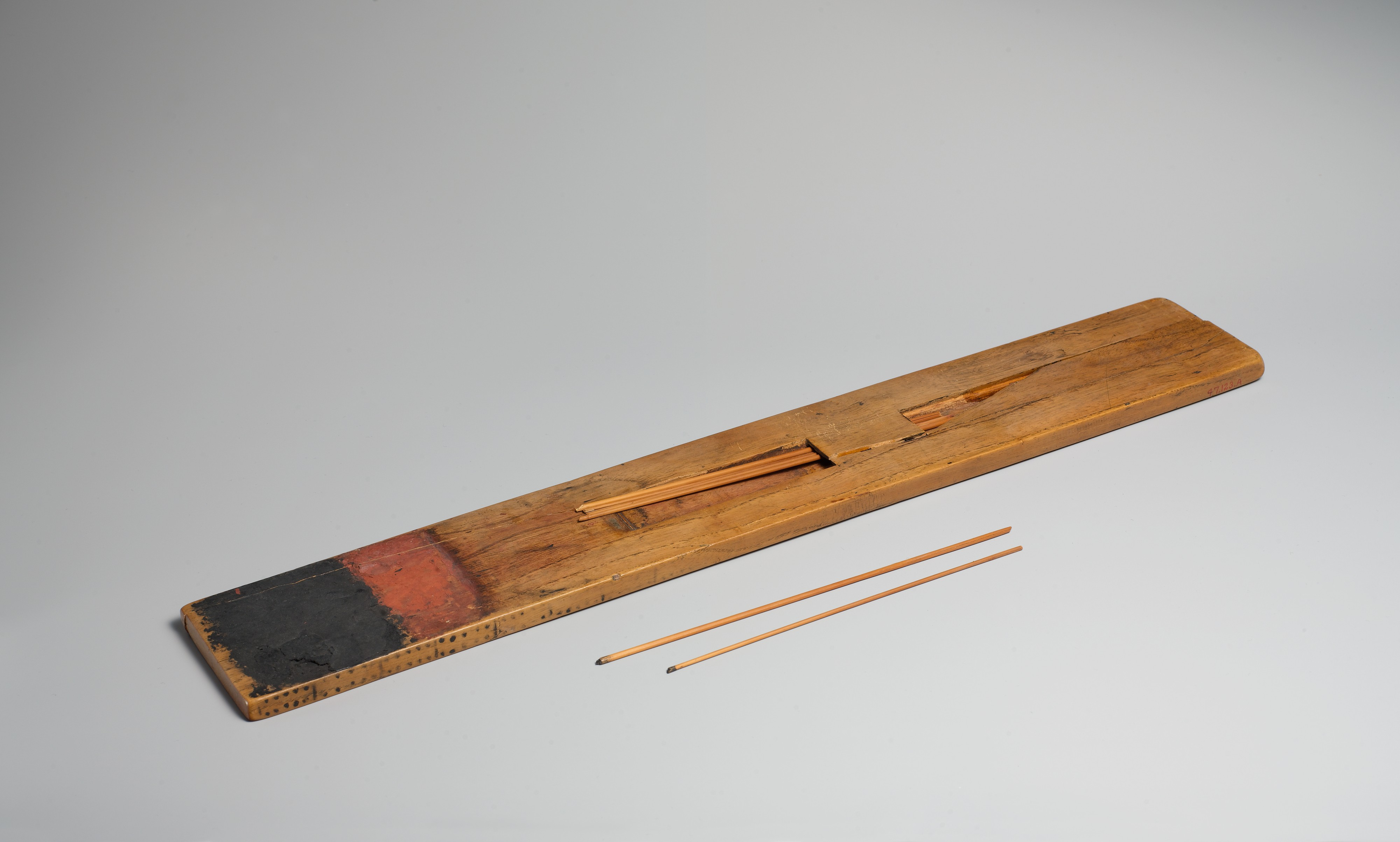
- Scribe's palette inscribed for the High Priest of Amun Smendes, likely Smendes III
Egyptian name
ns O34 Z4 Y1 G29 nb R11 R11Nsw-b3-nb-ḏdt
- Predecessor: Iuwelot
- Successor: Nimlot C?
- Dynasty: 22nd Dynasty
- Pharaoh: Takelot I
- Father: Osorkon I

Smendes III was a High Priest of Amun at Thebes during the reign of pharaoh Takelot I of the 22nd Dynasty.

== Biography ==
The name Smendes is a hellenization of the Egyptian name Nesbanebdjed ("He of the ram, lord of Mendes"), while the ordinal number distinguishes him from the founder of the 21st Dynasty Smendes I, and from the earlier, namesake High Priest of Amun, Smendes II.

A scarcely attested High Priest, he is mainly known for some Nile Level Texts at Karnak where he is called High Priest of Amun and son of king Osorkon: No. 17 (dating to a Year 8 of a deliberately omitted king), No. 18 (Year 13 or 14, king omitted) and No. 19 (Year lost, king omitted).

Despite the lack of a conclusive record, it is almost certain that the "king Osorkon" father of Smendes III is Osorkon I: therefore, Smendes was also the brother of his two predecessors Iuwelot and Shoshenq C and of the contemporary king Takelot I, Osorkon I's successor. Relying on the fact that the previous Nile Level (No. 16) was ordered by Iuwelot and dated in Year 5 of a nameless king who could only be Takelot I, it was concluded that the three levels ordered by Smendes were referring to the same pharaoh.

About his life and the events occurred under his mandate almost nothing is known; as shown before, he continued the practice begun by his predecessor of omitting the name of Takelot I from the Nile levels, possibly because of a presumed dynastic quarrel occurred in Upper Egypt after the death of Osorkon I. A scribe's palette now at the Metropolitan Museum of Art (47.123a–g) inscribed for a High Priest of Amun Smendes, more likely belongs to him rather than Smendes II. A bronze kneeling statuette of a High Priest of Amun Smendes exhibited at the Musée royal de Mariemont (ref. B242) cannot be securely attributed to one rather to another of the two namesake priests.

His succession is uncertain. According to Kenneth Kitchen, towards the end of the reign of Takelot I, Smendes III was succeeded by Harsiese A, a son of his brother Shoshenq C, which in addition to High priest of Amun proclaimed itself an independent sovereign in Thebes. This hypothesis was rejected by Karl Jansen-Winkeln who proved that Harsiese A never was High Priest of Amun, hence, Smendes' successor should be looked in other people, perhaps in Nimlot C.

== Bibliography ==
- Kenneth Kitchen, The Third Intermediate Period in Egypt (1100–650 BC), 1996, Aris & Phillips Limited, Warminster, ISBN 0-85668-298-5
