= Tashedkhonsu =

- Queen consort of Egypt
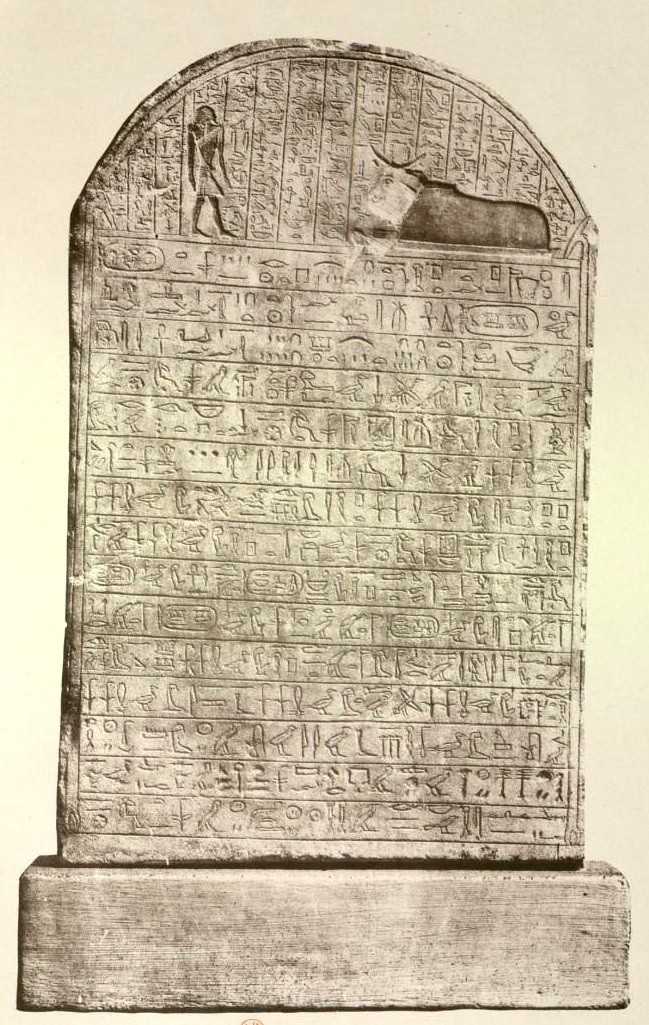
- The Stela of Pasenhor, main attestation for queen Tashedkhonsu
- Spouse: Pharaoh Osorkon I
- Issue: Pharaoh Takelot I
- Dynasty: 22nd of Egypt

t&A V23 Aa1 n sw w
Tashedkhonsu
in hieroglyphs
Era: 3rd Intermediate Period
(1069–664 BC)

Tashedkhons(u) was a wife of Pharaoh Osorkon I and the mother of Pharaoh Takelot I. She is known from the Pasenhor stela. Tashedkhonsu is given the title God's Mother on the stela. A shabti inscribed for Tashedkhonsu was found in the tomb of Takelot II, who was a distant descendant.
