= Kapes =

- Queen consort of Egypt
- Spouse: Pharaoh Takelot I
- Issue: Pharaoh Osorkon II
- Dynasty: 22nd of Egypt

U20 p Z7 z B7
Kapes
in hieroglyphs
Era: 3rd Intermediate Period
(1069–664 BC)

Kapes was a wife of Pharaoh Takelot I and the mother of Pharaoh Osorkon II. Kapes is mentioned on the Pasenhor stela found in the Serapeum of Saqqara. On the stela she has the title of God's mother. Kapes is also known from her son Osorkon II's tomb in Tanis. No further titles are mentioned for Kapes in her son's tomb. A lamentation text in her son's tomb end with the line "ir n.f K3pws" which translates to "Kapus did (or made) this for him".
