= Shoshenq A =

Chief in ancient Egypt

- Great Chief of the Ma
- Predecessor: Paihuty
- Successor: Nimlot A
- Dynasty: 21st Dynasty
- Spouse: Mehtenweshkhet A
- Father: Paihuty
- Children: Osorkon the Elder, Nimlot A

Shoshenq A, sometimes also called Shoshenq the Elder, was a Great Chief of the Ma during the 21st Dynasty of ancient Egypt. He is mainly known for being an ancestor of the 22nd Dynasty pharaohs.

== Biography ==
His wife was the King's mother Mehtenweshkhet A, who is actually better attested on monuments than her husband; thanks to those monuments and to the genealogy reported on the stela of Pasenhor, it was possible to determine some information about Shoshenq's family ties.

He was son of the Great Chief of the Ma Paihuty; Shoshenq A and Mehtenweshkhet A had at least two children, the 21st Dynasty pharaoh Osorkon the Elder, and the Great Chief of the Ma Nimlot A, himself the father of the future founder of the 22nd Dynasty, pharaoh Shoshenq I, who therefore was a grandson of Shoshenq A.

Paihuty; Great Chief
Shoshenq A Great Chief	Mehtenweskhet A
Osorkon the Elder	Nimlot A Great Chief; God's Father	Tentsepeh A
Shoshenq I
