= Iuwelot =

Egyptian High Priest of Amun

- High Priest of Amun in Thebes
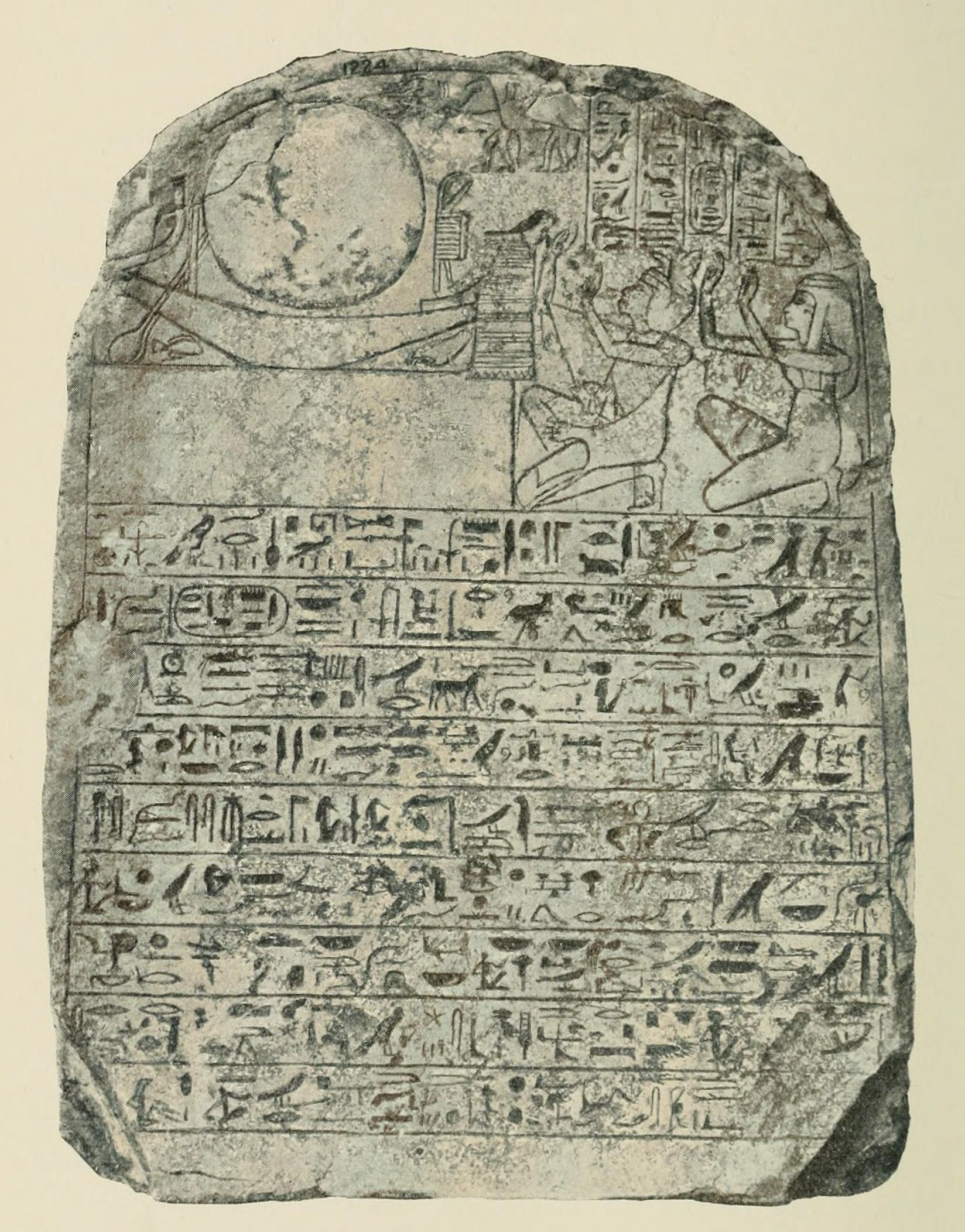
- Funerary stele of Iuwelot, from Thebes. British Museum, EA 1224
Egyptian name
Z7 E9 V4 G1 D21 N36 V13 Z1
- Predecessor: Shoshenq Q
- Successor: Smendes III
- Dynasty: 22nd Dynasty
- Pharaoh: Osorkon I and Takelot I
- Spouse: Tadenitenbastet; Ankhesenptah
- Father: Osorkon I
- Children: Harsiese; Wasakawasa; Djedeseiusankh; Khaemwast (stepson)

Iuwelot or Iuwlot was a High Priest of Amun at Thebes and military commander during the reign of pharaohs Osorkon I (reigned 922–887 BC) and Takelot I (reigned 885–872 BC) of the 22nd Dynasty.

== Biography ==
As a son of Osorkon I, Iuwelot was brother of his predecessor Shoshenq Q, of his successor Smendes III and of his contemporary king Takelot I.

His earliest mention is on the so-called Stèle de l'apanage, from which is known that Iuwelot was a youth in Year 10 of Osorkon I. His name appears later as High Priest of Amun on a Nile Level Text at Karnak (no. 16), dating to a Year 5 of an unknown pharaoh. Scottish Egyptologist Kenneth Kitchen argued that this king could not be Osorkon I, since it would implied that Iuwelot was already High Priest and Army commander of the South very early in his life; Kitchen thought it was much more likely that the unnamed pharaoh was Takelot I, and thus that Iuwelot must have been around 40 years old when he was appointed with such titles. On the Stèle de l'apanage is reported that the northern limit of his jurisdiction as a military commander was the province of Asyut.

Iuwelot's name appears also on other two Nile Level Texts (no. 20 and 21), but the name and regnal year of the king in question was deliberately omitted, although he could only have been Takelot I again. This practice, which was continued by Iuwelot's brother and successor Smendes III, might suggest a sort of dispute in Upper Egypt in the succession following the death of Osorkon I, due to which the two priests may not have had the chance to take sides in favor of their brother.

He was succeeded by Smendes III around the mid-reign of Takelot.

=== Family ===
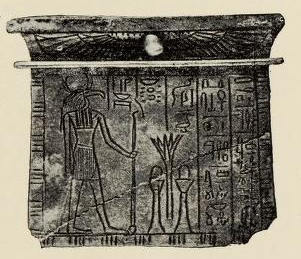
Pectoral of Wasakawasa, son of Iuwelot

In addition to his aforementioned brothers, other Iuwelot's relatives are known.
On his Theban funerary stele (British Museum 1224), he is depicted together with his wife Tadenitenbastet, here called "sister", both worshipping Ra-Horakhty. His son Wasakawasa is known by an electrum pectoral dedicated to Thoth, Lord of Hermopolis (Petrie Museum UC13124), although he will never become High Priest like the father. A daughter, Djedeseiusankh, is also known while another (step)son, Khamweset, is mentioned on the Stèle de l'apanage as the beneficiary of his father's Theban possessions.

== Bibliography ==
- Kenneth Kitchen, The Third Intermediate Period in Egypt (1100–650 BC), 1996, Aris & Phillips Limited, Warminster, ISBN 0-85668-298-5
