= Takelot I =

Egyptian pharaoh (885–872 BC)

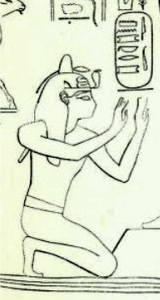

Pharaoh
- Reign: 885–872 BC
- Predecessor: Osorkon I
- Successor: Osorkon II or Shoshenq II or Tutkheperre Shoshenq
Royal titulary
Prenomen
Hedjkheperre Setepenre
ḥḏ-ḫpr-rˁ stp.n-rˁ
"Radiant manifestation of Ra, the chosen one of Ra"
M23 t L2 t < N5 S1 L1 N5 U21 n >
Nomen
Takelot Meriamum
tklt mr.j jmn
"Takelot, beloved of Amun"

G39 N5	M17 Y5 N35 N36 U33 V31 r N36 U33
- Consort: Kapes
- Children: Osorkon II
- Father: Osorkon I
- Mother: Tashedkhonsu
- Died: 872 BC
- Dynasty: Dynasty XXII

Hedjkheperre Setepenre Takelot I was an ancient Libyan ruler who was pharaoh during the Twenty-second Dynasty of Egypt.

== Reign ==
Takelot I was the son of Osorkon I and Queen Tashedkhons, who ruled Egypt for thirteen years according to Manetho. Takelot married Queen Kapes, who bore him Osorkon II. Initially, Takelot was believed to be an ephemeral 22nd Dynasty Pharaoh since no monuments at Tanis or Lower Egypt could be conclusively linked to his reign—or even mentioned his existence, except for the famous Stela of Pasenhor, which dates to Year 37 of Shoshenq V.

However, since the late 1980s, Egyptologists have assigned several documents mentioning a king Takelot in Lower Egypt to this newly discovered Takelot (now Takelot I), rather than the previously known Takelot (now to be called Takelot II). Takelot I's reign was relatively short when compared to the 30+ year reigns of his father Osorkon I and son, Osorkon II. Takelot I, rather than Takelot II, was the king Hedjkheperre Setepenre Takelot who is attested by a Year 9 stela from Bubastis, as well as the owner of a partly robbed Royal Tomb at Tanis as the German Egyptologist Karl Jansen-Winkeln reported in a 1987 Varia Aegyptiaca 3 (1987), pp. 253–258 paper. Evidently, both king Takelots used the same royal prenomen: Hedjkheperre Setepenre. The main difference between Takelot I and II is that Takelot I never employed the Theban-inspired epithet Si-Ese "Son of Isis" in his titulary, unlike Takelot II.

As Kenneth Kitchen writes in the third (1996) edition of his book The Third Intermediate Period in Egypt:

It was Takeloth I who first used the prenomen Hedjkheperre Setepenre (in imitation of his grandfather Shoshenq I), being followed in this [practise] by Takeloth II. The only clear distinction... between Takeloth I and II (as both use the epithet Meriamun) is that Takeloth II uses also the epithet Si-Ese, "Son of Isis", in his second cartouche. A second marker suggested by Jansen-Winkeln (with some reserve) is that Takeloth I has his name spelt with the vertical t-sign (Gardiner U33, ti becoming t), while [both] Takeloth II and III use the small loaf t-sign (X 1), and the rope-tether sign (V 13). This criterion...seems sound. This would suggest attributing to Takeloth I (not II) a donation-stela of Year 9 (from Bubastis), another in Berlin (also from Bubastis) and a fragment in the former Grant collection. This also bears on the high priests of Ptah at Memphis and the Serapeum. There, a block is known bearing the name of a high priest Merenptah and a pair of cartouches hitherto attributed to Takeloth II, which, in fact, correspond precisely to those now attributable to Takeloth I (no Si-Ese; tall t). Therefore it seems proper to move this priest back in time to the reign of Takeloth I.

== Tomb ==
The evidence that the royal Tanite tomb belonged to Takelot I was suggested long ago by the presence of grave goods found within the burial that mentioned his known parents: "namely a Gold Bracelet (Cairo JE 72199) and an alabaster Jar (Cairo JE 86962) of Osorkon I, and an Ushabti figure of Queen Tashedkhons". In addition, a heart scarab found in the king's burial gave his name simply as "Takelot Meryamun" without the Si-Ese epithet used by Takelot II. Recent confirmation of this circumstantial evidence was published by the German scholar Karl Jansen-Winkeln in 1987. His examination of several inscriptions written on the tomb's walls proved beyond doubt that the person buried here could only be Takelot I, Osorkon II's father. Jansen-Winkeln's conclusions have been accepted by many modern Egyptologists, including Professor Kenneth Kitchen. Osorkon II arranged for this aforementioned inscription to be carved on a scene in his tomb where Osorkon is depicted adoring Osiris and Udjo (as a uraeus).

[Made?] by the King of the South & North Egypt, Lord of Both Lands, Usimare Setepenamun, Son of Re, Lord of Crowns, Osorkon II Meryamun, [to furbish] the Osiris (i.e., deceased) King Takelot Meryamun in his Mansion which is [an abode] of the Sun-disc: I have caused him to rest in this Mansion in the vicinity of 'Hidden-of Name' (Amun), according to the doing by a son of benefactions for his father, [to] furbish the one who has made his fortune in conformity with that Horus Son-of-Isis, commanded for his father, Wennufer. How pleasant (it is) in my heart, for the Lord of the Gods!

Above the inscription was carved the cartouche of Osorkon II and the following text: "A Son, furbishing the one who created (i.e., begot) him".

This text establishes that Osorkon II honoured his father by reburying him in the Tanite royal tomb complex. Takelot I's final resting place forms the third chamber of Osorkon II's tomb, which means that Osorkon II interred his father within the walls of his own tomb. Takelot I was buried in a usurped Middle Kingdom sarcophagus that was inscribed with his own cartouche.

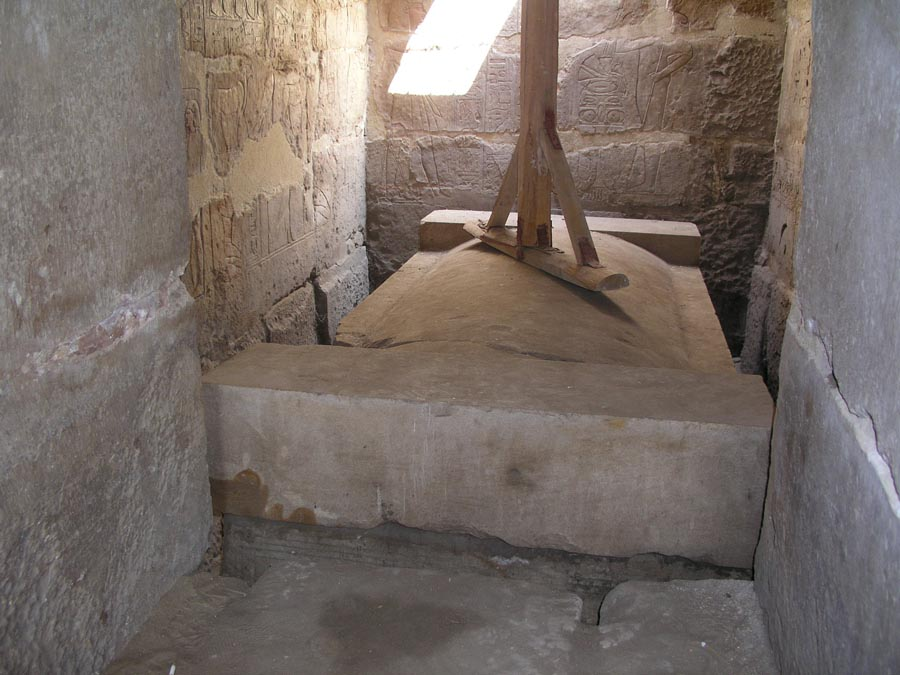
The sarcophagus of Takelot I at Tanis

== Authority ==
Takelot I's authority was not fully recognised in Upper Egypt, and Harsiese A, or another local Theban king, challenged his power there. Several Nile Level Texts at Thebes mention two sons of Osorkon I—namely, the High Priests of Amun Iuwelot and Smendes III in Years 5, 8 and 14 of an anonymous king who can only be Takelot I, since Takelot I was their brother.

Uniquely, however, the Quay Texts specifically omit any reference to the identity of the king himself. This might suggest that there was a dispute in the royal succession following Osorkon I's death in Upper Egypt, which seriously impaired Takelot I's control there. Harsiese A, as the son of the High Priest Shoshenq C and grandson of Osorkon I, or a hypothetical king named Maatkheperre Shoshenq must have appeared as a rival. The Theban priests henceforth chose to avoid any involvement in this dispute by deliberately leaving the name of the king in the Quay Texts 'Blank' rather than choosing sides, as G. Broekman notes in his study of the Karnak Quay Texts. This situation was ultimately later resolved by Osorkon II who is clearly attested as Pharaoh at Thebes by his 12th Regnal Year, according to Nile Level Texts No.8 and No.9.
