= Shoshenq I =

Pharaoh of Egypt

- Sesonkhosis, Sesonkhis (Σέσωγχις)
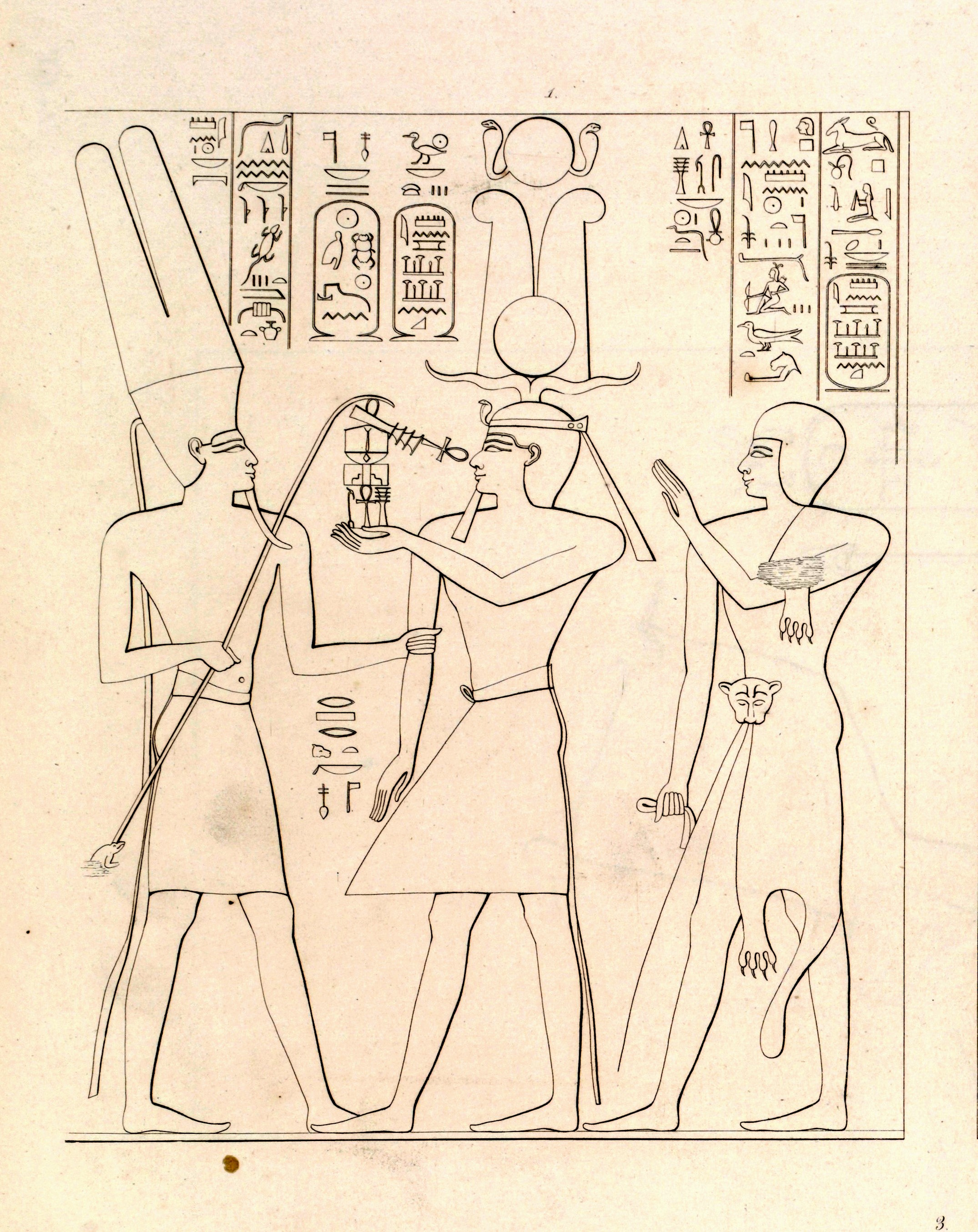
- Shoshenq I (middle) gives offering to Amun (left), accompanied by his son Iuput (right), drawn by Ippolito Rosellini at the Bubastite Portal.

Pharaoh
- Reign: 21 regnal years 943–922 BC
- Predecessor: Psusennes II
- Successor: Osorkon I
Royal titulary
Horus name
Kanakht Meryre Sekhafemnisuterzematawy
kȝ nḫt mrj-Rˁ sḫˁj.f-m-nsw-r-zm3-t3wj
Strong bull, beloved of Ra, he who causes the king to unite the two lands
| G5 | E2 D36 N5 U7 s N28 D36 I9 Aa13 M23 D21 M15 N19 |
Nebty name
Khaemsekhemtimihorsaaset Sehotepnetjeruemmaat
ḫˁj-m-sḫmtj-mj-Ḥr-z3-3st sḥtp-nṯrw-m-M3ˁt
The double crown appears as Horus son of Isis, he who satisfies the gods in Maat
| G16 | N28 D36 Aa13 S6 W19 G5 H8 Z1 Q1 X1 H8 S29 R4 X1 Q3 X1 Z2 R8 G17 H6 |
Golden Horus
Sekhempehti Huipedjut-9 Wernekhtutaunebu
sḫm-pḥtj ḥwj-pḏt-psḏt wr-nḫtw-(m)-t3w-nbw
He whose mighty power vanquishes the nine bows (enemies of Egypt), he who is great of victories in all countries
| G8 | S42 F9 F9 V28 A24 D40 T10 THREE THREE THREE G36 D21 n xt x t Z2 D40 N17 N17 N17 V30 Z7 THREE |
Prenomen
Hedjkheperre Setepenre
ḥḏ-ḫpr-Rˁ stp.n-Rˁ
Radiant is the manifestation of Ra, the chosen one of Ra
M23 t L2 t < N5 S1 L1 N5 U19 N35 >
Nomen
Shoshenq Meriamun
Ššnq mrj Jmn
Shoshenq, beloved of Amun
G39 N5 < M17 Y5 N35 N36 M8 M8 N35 N29 >
Variant:
Shoshenq Meriamun Netjerheqaiunu
Ššnq mrj Jmn nṯr hq3 Iwnw
Shoshenq, beloved of Amun, divine ruler of Iunu
G39 N5 < M8 M8 N35 N29 M17 Y5 N35 U7 R8 S38 O28 >
- Consorts: Patareshnes, Karomama A
- Children: Osorkon I, Iuput A, Nimlot B
- Father: Nimlot A
- Mother: Tentsepeh A
- Died: 922 BC
- Dynasty: 22nd Dynasty

Hedjkheperre Setepenre Shoshenq I (Egyptian šꜣšꜣnq; reigned c. 943–922 BC)—also known as Shashank or Sheshonk or Sheshonq I (Note: for discussion of the spelling, see Shoshenq)—was a pharaoh of ancient Egypt and the founder of the Twenty-second Dynasty of Egypt.

He is generally presumed to be the Shishak mentioned in the Hebrew Bible, and his exploits are carved on the Bubastite Portal at Karnak.

== Family ==
Shoshenq I was the son of Nimlot A (Great Chief of the Ma) and Tentsepeh A (daughter of a Great Chief of the Ma), of Meshwesh ancestry,

His paternal grandparents were the Chief of the Ma Shoshenq A and his wife Mehytenweskhet A. Shoshenq was the nephew of Osorkon the Elder, also a Meshwesh who had served on the throne (as regent) in the preceding 21st Dynasty. Hence, Shoshenq I's rise to power was not wholly unexpected.

== Early life ==
=== Reign of Psusennes II ===
During the reign of Psusennes II, he served as chief advisor to the king and Commander-in-Chief of the Egyptian Army. He became the father-in-law of Maatkare B, king's daughter of Psusennes II, when she married his son Osorkon I.

He also held his father's title of Great Chief of the Ma or Meshwesh, which is an Egyptian word for Ancient Libyans. His ancestors had settled in Egypt during the late New Kingdom, probably at Herakleopolis Magna, though Manetho claims Shoshenq himself came from Bubastis, a claim for which no supporting physical evidence has yet been discovered.

== Reign ==
=== Foreign policy ===
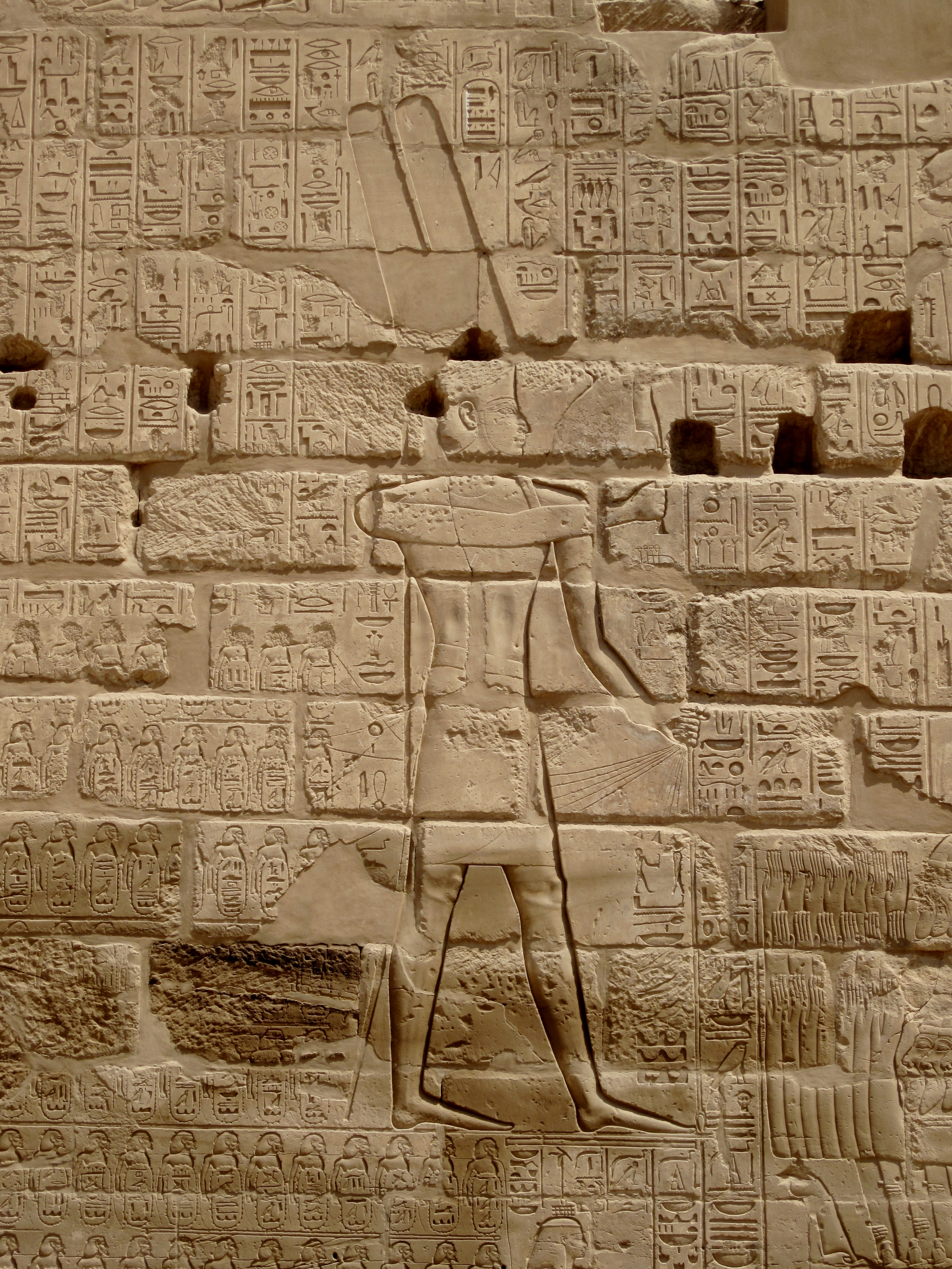
The Triumphal Relief of Shoshenq I near the Bubastite Portal at Karnak, depicting the god Amun-Re receiving a list of cities and villages conquered by the king in his Near Eastern military campaigns

He pursued an aggressive foreign policy in the adjacent territories of the Middle East, towards the end of his reign. This is attested, in part, by the discovery of a statue base bearing his name from the Lebanese city of Byblos, part of a monumental stela from Megiddo bearing his name, and a list of cities in the region comprising Syria, Philistia, Phoenicia, the Negev, and the Kingdom of Israel, among various topographical lists inscribed on the walls of temples of Amun at al-Hibah and Karnak. The fragment of a stela bearing his cartouche from Megiddo has been interpreted as a monument Shoshenq erected there to commemorate his victory. Some of these conquered cities include ancient Israelite fortresses such as Megiddo, Taanach and Shechem.

There are other problems with Shoshenq being the same as the biblical Shishak: Shoshenq's Karnak list does not include Jerusalem—his biggest prize according to the Bible. His list focuses on places either north or south of Judah, as if he did not raid the center. The fundamental problem facing historians is establishing the aims of the two accounts and linking up the information in them.

There have been some possible suggestions and proposals from scholars regarding this issue. Some argue that the mention of Jerusalem was erased from the list over time. Others believe that Rehoboam's tribute to Shoshenq saved the city from destruction and therefore from the Bubastite Portal's lists. Some scholars even propose that Shoshenq claimed a conquest that he did not enact and copied the list of conquered territories from an old Pharaoh's conquest list.

As an addendum to his foreign policy, Shoshenq I carved a report of campaigns in Nubia and Israel, with a detailed list of conquests in Israel. This is the first military action outside Egypt formally commemorated for several centuries. This report of conquests is the only surviving late Iron Age text concerning Canaan.

==== Megiddo ====
In the transitional Iron IB/Iron IIA, Shoshenq I apparently destroyed Megiddo Stratum VIa (Iron IB). At Megiddo, a large limestone fragment was found in a fill in 1925, and interpreted as part of a victory stela with two inscriptions where one reads: "The Good God, Hedjkheperre-setepenre Lord of [ritual] performance, Sheshonq I, beloved of Amun." A reexamination indicate the fragment may be an architectural element rather than a stela. The Bubastite Portal at Karnak listed Megiddo as town No. 27 in Shoshenq's topographical list of conquests, the discovery of the physical stone at Megiddo confirms that the Karnak list is a historical itinerary and not just a "template" of traditional enemies.

=== Domestic policy ===
Libyan concepts of rule allowed for the parallel existence of leaders who were related by marriage and blood. Shoshenq and his immediate successors used that practice to consolidate their grasp on all of Egypt. Shoshenq terminated the hereditary succession of the high priesthood of Amun. Instead he and his successors appointed men to the position, most often their own sons, a practice that lasted for a century.

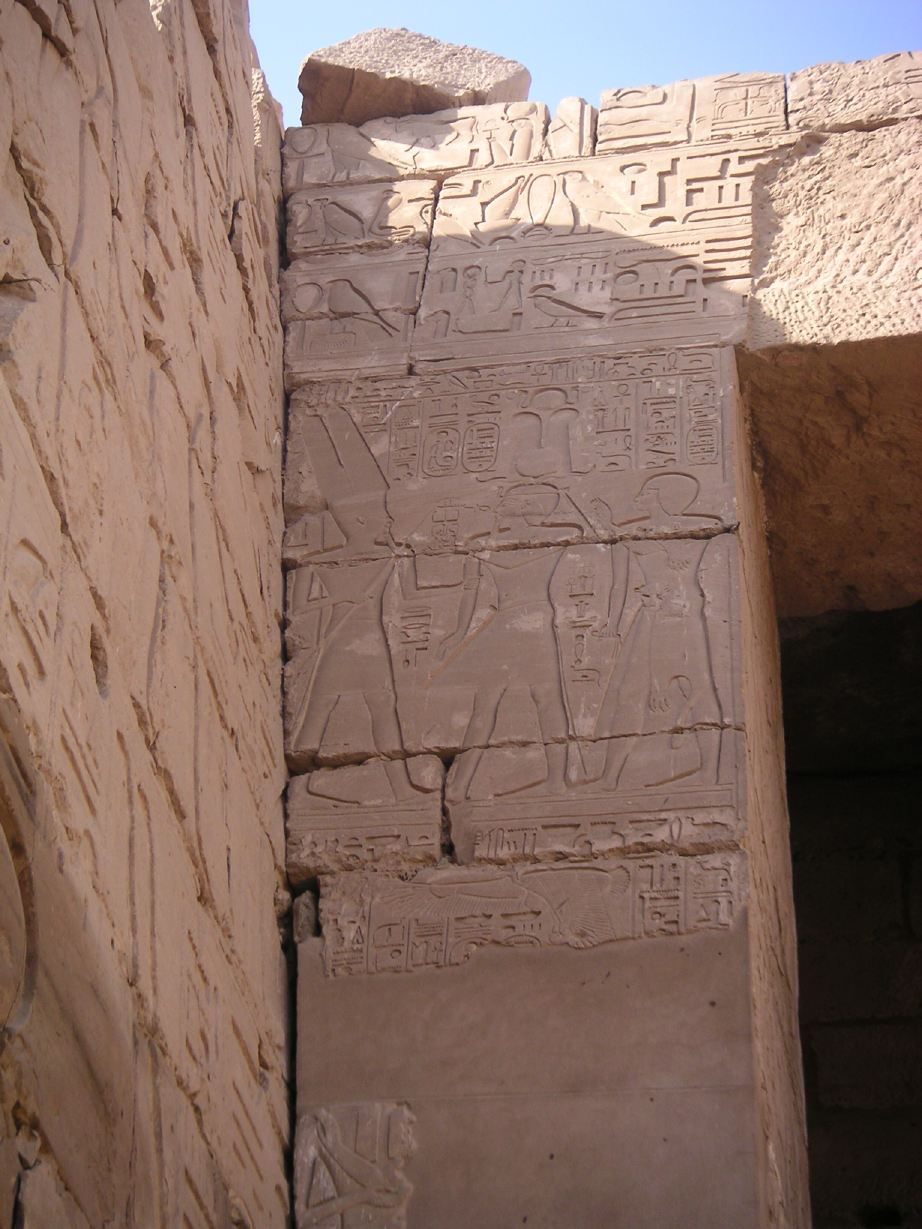
The Bubastite Portal at Karnak, depicting Shoshenq I and his second son, the High Priest Iuput A

As king, Shoshenq chose his eldest son, Osorkon I, as his successor and consolidated his authority over Egypt through marriage alliances and appointments. He assigned his second son, Iuput A, the prominent position of High Priest of Amun at Thebes as well as the title of Governor of Upper Egypt and Commander of the Army to consolidate his authority over the Thebaid. Finally, Shoshenq I designated his third son, Nimlot B, as the "Leader of the Army" at Herakleopolis in Middle Egypt.

==== Upper Egypt ====
At Thebes, Nile Level Record 3 (Year 5, -0,21 m) and Nile Level Record 1 (Year 6, +0,07 m) at Karnak Quay.

The Gebel el-Silsila Inscription (Silsila No. 100) is dated to Year 21, II Shemu (Summer), a quarry between Edfu and Kom Ombo for temples in Upper Egypt. It records the opening of a new quarry to extract stone for a massive building project at the Temple of Amun in Karnak. The text mentions the king's architect and high official, Horemakhet, who was tasked with overseeing the work. The text contains a specific phrase that ties it to the Levantine campaign. It states that the stone was being quarried to build: "...a great pylon for the temple of Amun-Re... and a festival hall... to celebrate the first campaign of victory which His Majesty carried out." (cf. Bubastite Pylon).

The burial of one of his prominent state officials at Thebes, the Third Prophet of Amun Djedptahiufankh, was discovered intact in tomb DB320 in the 19th century. Inscriptions on Djedptahiufankh's Mummy bandages show that he died in or after Year 11 of this king. His mummy was discovered to contain various gold bracelets, amulets and precious carnelian objects, and give a small hint of the vast treasures that would have adorned Shoshenq I's tomb.

=== Succession ===
Shoshenq I was succeeded by his son Osorkon I after a reign of 21 years.

== Death ==
=== Tomb ===
The Tomb of Shoshenq I has not been located.

==== Canopic Chest ====
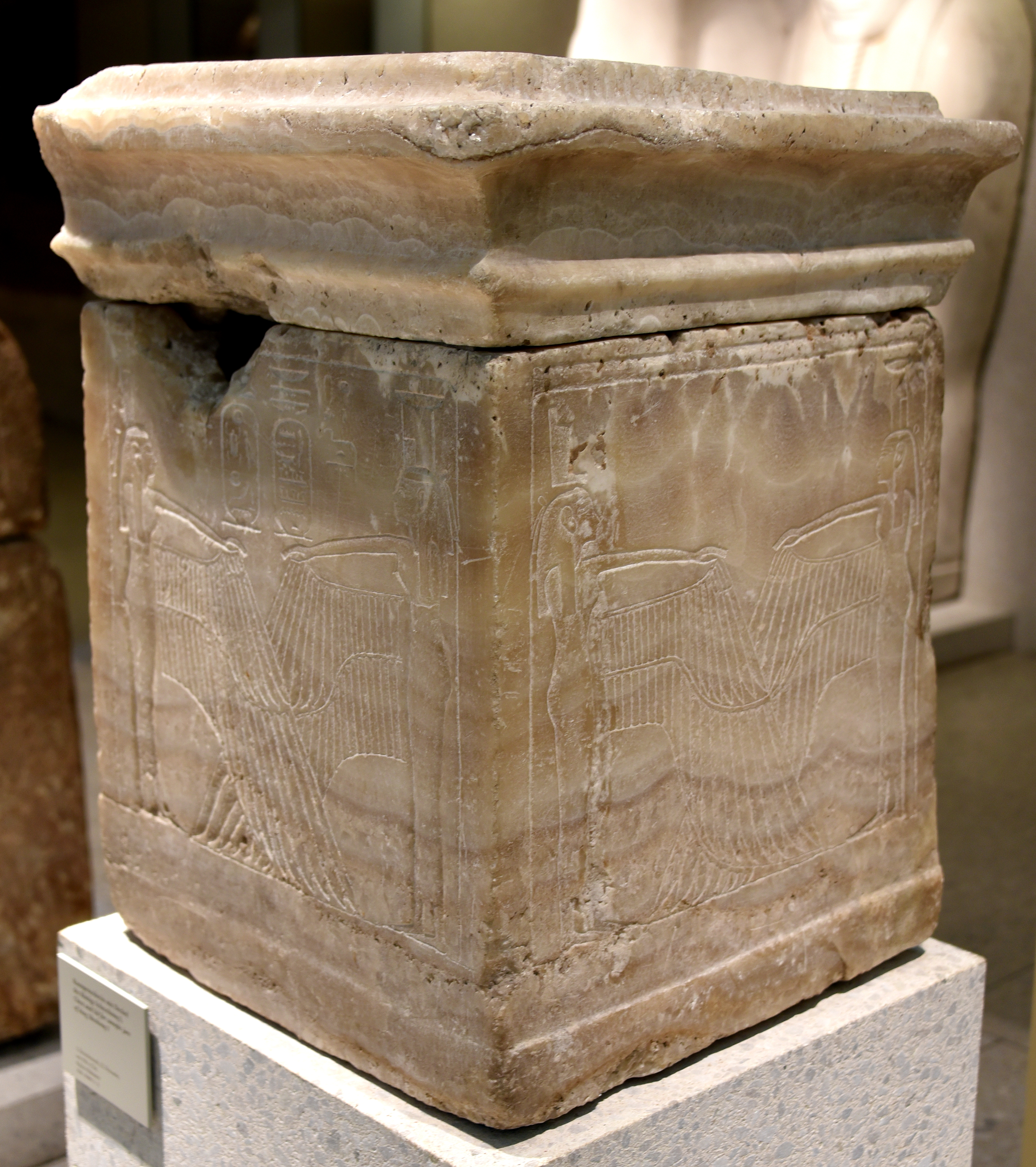
Canopic chest and lid of Shoshenq I at the Neues Museum, Berlin

Of unknown provenance, a canopic chest of Shoshenq I was donated to the Egyptian Museum of Berlin (ÄMB 11000) by Julius Isaac in 1891. This may indicate his tomb was looted in antiquity, but this hypothesis is unproven.

==== Quest for the Tomb ====
Egyptologists differ over the location of Shoshenq I's burial and speculate that he may have been buried somewhere in Tanis—perhaps in one of the anonymous royal tombs here—or in Bubastis. However, Troy Sagrillo in a GM 205 (2005) paper observes that "there are only a bare handful of inscribed blocks from Tanis that might name the king (i.e. Shoshenq I) and none of these come from an in situ building complex contemporary with his reign." Hence, it is more probable that Shoshenq was buried in another city in the Egyptian Delta. Sagrillo offers a specific location for Shoshenq's burial—the Ptah temple enclosure of Memphis—and notes that this king built:

fairly widely in the area, undoubtedly including a pylon and forecourt at the Ptah temple (Kitchen, TIPE 1996, pp. 149–150) ...It is, therefore, not completely improbable that he (i.e., Shoshenq I) built his tomb in the region. The funerary cult surrounding his "House of Millions of Years of Shoshenq, Beloved of Amun" was functioning several generations after its establishment at the temple (Ibrahem Aly Sayed 1996, p. 14). The "House of Millions of Years of Shoshenq, Beloved of Amun" was probably the forecourt and pylon of the Ptah temple, which, if the royal necropoleis at Tanis, Saïs, and Mendes are taken as models, could very well have contained a royal burial within it or the temenos.

Sagrillo concludes by observing that if Shoshenq I's burial place was located at Memphis, "it would go far in explaining why this king's funerary cult lasted for some time at the site after his death."

== Chronology ==
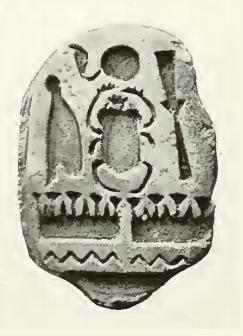
A scarab of Hedjkheperre Shoshenq I and Sekhemkheperre Osorkon I

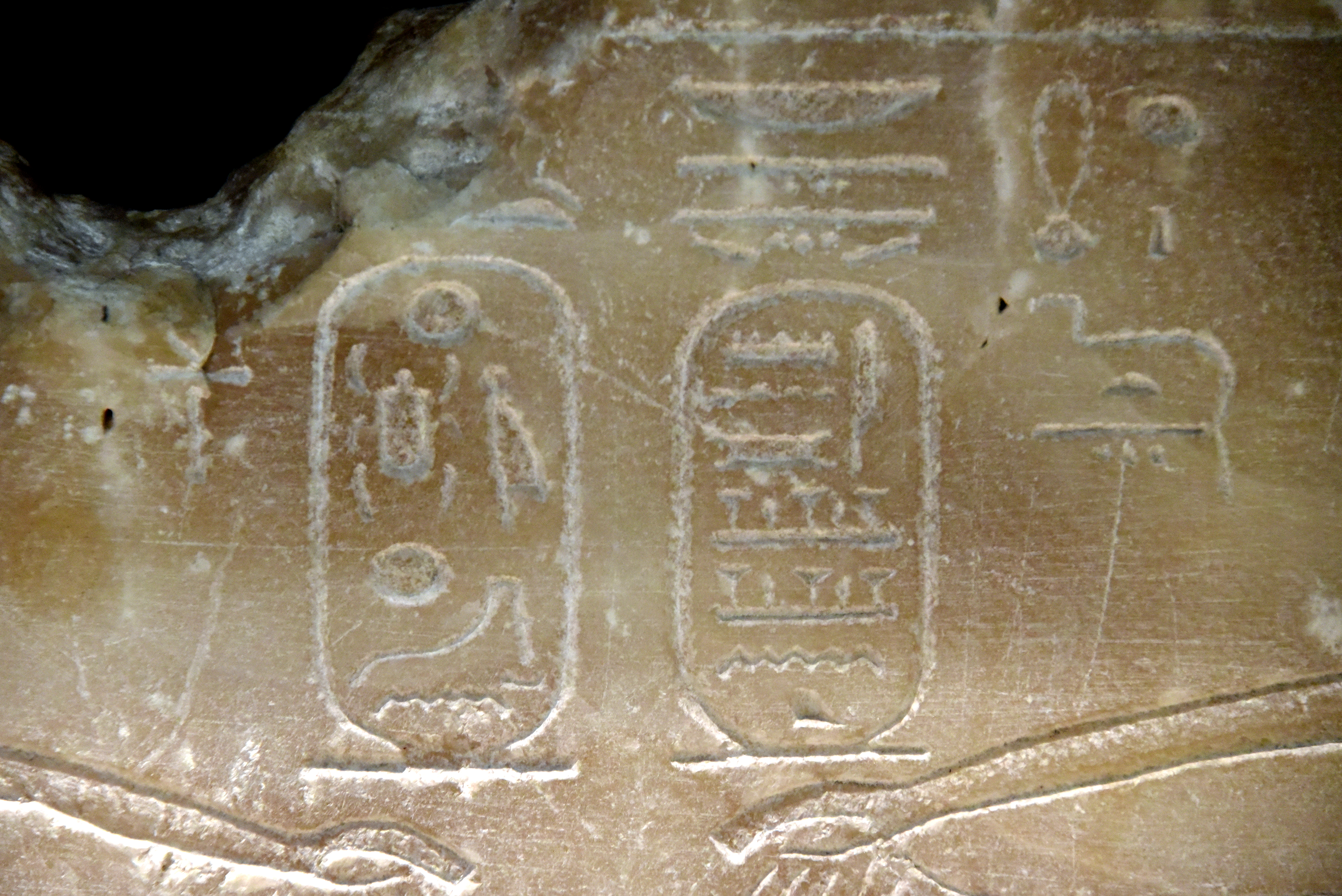
Birth and throne names of Shoshenq I

The conventional dates for his reign, as established by Kenneth Kitchen, are 945–924 BC but this timeline has recently been revised downwards by a few years to 943–922 BC, since he may well have lived for up to two to three years after his successful campaign in the Kingdom of Israel (Samaria) and the Kingdom of Judah, conventionally dated to 925 BC. As Edward Wente of the University of Chicago noted (1976) on page 276 of his JNES 35 Book Review of Kitchen's study of the Third Intermediate Period, there is "no certainty" that Shoshenq's 925 BC campaign terminated just prior to this king's death a year later in 924 BC. Egyptologist Morris Bierbrier also dated Shoshenq I's accession "between 945–940 BC" in his 1975 book concerning the genealogies of Egyptian officials, who served during the late New Kingdom and Third Intermediate Period.

Bierbrier based his opinion on Biblical evidence collated by William F. Albright in a BASOR 130 paper. This development would also account for the mostly unfinished state of decorations of Shoshenq's building projects at the Great Temple of Karnak where only scenes of the king's Palestinian military campaign are fully carved. Building materials would first have had to be extracted and architectural planning performed for his great monumental projects here. Such activities usually took up to a year to complete before work was even begun. This would imply that Shoshenq I likely lived for a period in excess of one year after his 925 BC campaign. On the other hand, if the Karnak inscription was concurrent with Shoshenq's campaign into Canaan, the fact that it was left unfinished would suggest this campaign occurred in the last year of Shoshenq's reign. This possibility would also permit his 945 BC accession date to be slightly lowered to 943 BC.

A 2005 study by Rolf Krauss of ancient Egyptian chronology suggests that Shoshenq I came to power in 943 BC rather than 945 BC as is conventionally assumed based on epigraphic evidence from the Great Dakhla stela, which dates to Year 5 of his reign. Krauss and David Warburton write in the 2006 book Ancient Egyptian Chronology:

The chronology of early Dyn. 22 depends on dead reckoning. The sum of the highest attested regnal dates for Osorkon II, Takelot I, Osorkon I, and Shoshenq I, added to 841 BC as year 1 of Shoshenq III, yields 938 BC at the latest for year 1 of Shoshenq I...[However] The large Dakhla stela provides a lunar date in the form of a wrš feast in year 5 of Shoshenq [I], yielding 943 BC as his year 1.

The Year 5 wrš feast is recorded to have been celebrated at Dakhla Oasis on IV Peret day 25 and Krauss' exploration of the astronomical data leads him to conclude that the only 'fit' within the period of 950 to 930 BC places the accession of Shoshenq I between December 944 and November 943 BC—or 943 BC for the most part. However, Dr. Anthony Leahy has suggested that "the identification of the wrš-festival of Seth as [a] lunar [festival] is hypothetical, and [thus] its occurrence on the first day of a lunar month is [an] assumption. Neither has been proven incontrovertibly." Thus far, however, only Dr. Kenneth Kitchen is on record as sharing the same academic view.

A 2010 study by Thomas Schneider argued that Shoshenq reigned from 962 to 941 BC. Ido Koch in his 2021 book considered Schneider's chronology of Egyptian kings as a valuable integrative study. However, recent archaeomagnetic dating at Beit She'an, one of three early sites that could have been destroyed by Shoshenq I, shows 68.2% probability the destruction occurred between 935 and 900 BC, and 95.4% probability it occurred between 940 and 879 BC.

== Biblical Shishak ==
Shoshenq I is conventionally identified with the Egyptian king Shishak (שׁישׁק Šîšaq, transliterated), referred to in the Hebrew Bible at 1 Kings 11:40, 14:25 and 2 Chronicles 12:2–9. A common variant of Shoshenq's name omits its 'n' glyphs, resulting in a pronunciation like "Shoshek" (Egyptian ššq). According to these passages of the Hebrew Bible, Jeroboam fled from Solomon and stayed with Shishak until Solomon died, and Shishak invaded Judah, mostly the area of Benjamin, during the fifth year of the reign of Rehoboam, taking with him most of the treasures of the temple built by Solomon. The egyptologist Kenneth Kitchen proposes that Shoshenq's successor, Osorkon I, lavished 383 tons of gold and silver on Egyptian temples during the first four years of his reign and correlate it directly to the looting, while the archaeologist Israel Finkelstein claims that the looting narrative in question "should probably be seen as a theological construct rather than as historical references".

Shishak/Sousakim was also related to Jeroboam: "the wife of Jeroboam" is a character in the Hebrew Bible. She is unnamed in the Masoretic Text, but according to the Septuagint, she was an Egyptian princess called Ano:

And Sousakim gave to Jeroboam Ano the eldest sister of Thekemina his wife, to him as wife; she was great among the king's daughters...

Archaeologists at Tel Gezer recently concluded that correlation of Stratum 7, (927–885 BC, 68.3% hpd), "with Shishak/Sheshonq I's [e]nd boundary, [included in] the biblical date for Shishak's campaign [d]oes not fit well with [their] current 14C-based estimates for Sheshonq I," which they considered to be (c. 969–940 BC with 68.3% hpd, and 991–930 BC with 95.4% hpd) in Stratum 8.

== See also ==
- List of biblical figures identified in extra-biblical sources

== Bibliography ==
- M. Bierbrier, The Late New Kingdom in Egypt (c.1300-664 BC), Aris & Philips Ltd, (1975)
- Ricardo A. Caminos, Gebel Es-Silsilah No. 100, JEA 38 (1952), pp. 46–61
- Rupert L. Chapman III, Putting Shoshenq I in his Place, Palestine Exploration Quarterly 141, 1 (2009), pp. 4–17
- M. Georges Daressy, Les Parents de Chéchanq I^{er}, ASAE 16 (1916), 3
- Aidan Dodson, The Canopic Equipment of the Kings of Egypt, Kegan Paul Intl, (1994)
- Erika Feucht, Zwei Reliefs Scheschonqs I. aus El Hibeh, SAK 6 (1978), 69–77
- Alan H. Gardiner, The Dakhleh Stela, JEA 19 (1933), 19–30
- Rolf Krauss, Das wrš-Datum aus Jahr 5 von Shoshenq [I], Discussions in Egyptology 62 (2005), pp. 43–48
- Yigal Levin, 'Sheshonq I and the Negev Haserim', Maarav 17 (2010), pp. 189–215.
- Karl Jansen-Winkeln, The Chronology of the Third Intermediate Period: DYNS. 22–24 in Erik Hornung, Rolf Krauss, David A. Warburton (eds.) Ancient Egyptian Chronology (Handbook of Oriental Studies 83), Leiden 2006, pp.234-264
- Yigal Levin, "Sheshonq's Levantine Conquest and Biblical History". In: Jonathan S. Greer, John W. Hilber, & John H. Walton (eds.), Behind the Scenes of the Old Testament: Cultural, Social, and Historical Contexts, Grand Rapids: Baker Academic, 2018.
- Thomas E. Levy, Stefan Münger, and Mohammad Najjar, "A Newly Discovered Scarab of Sheshonq I: Recent Iron Age Explorations in Southern Jordan", Antiquity 88, 341 (September 2014).
- Troy Leiland Sagrillo, 'The Mummy of Shoshenq I Re-discovered?,' GM 205 (2005), pp. 95–102
- Troy Leiland Sagrillo, 'The Geographic Origins of the "Bubastite" Dynasty and Possible Locations for the Royal Residence and Burial Place of Shoshenq I.' In The Libyan period in Egypt: Historical and cultural studies into the 21st–24th Dynasties, edited by G.P.F. Broekman, R.J. Demarée, and O. Kaper. Egyptologische Uitgaven 23, Leuven: Uitgeverij Peeters. 2009: pp. 341–359
- Troy Leiland Sagrillo, 'Šîšaq's army: 2 Chronicles 12:2–3 from an Egyptological perspective' In The ancient Near East in the 12th–10th Centuries BCE: Culture and history; proceedings of the international conference held at the University of Haifa, 2–5 May 2010, edited by Gershon Galil, Ayelet Gilboa, Aren M. Maeir, and Dan'el Kahn. Alter Orient und Altes Testament: Veröffentlichungen zur Kultur und Geschichte des Alten Orients und des Alten Testaments 392. Münster: Ugarit-Verlag. 2012: pp. 425–450.
- Troy Leiland Sagrillo. 2015. "Shoshenq I and biblical Šîšaq: A philological defense of their traditional equation." In Solomon and Shishak: Current perspectives from archaeology, epigraphy, history and chronology; proceedings of the third BICANE colloquium held at Sidney Sussex College, Cambridge 26–27 March 2011, edited by Peter J. James, Peter G. van der Veen, and Robert M. Porter. British Archaeological Reports (International Series) 2732. Oxford: Archaeopress. 61–81.
