= Osorkon I =

Egyptian pharaoh (c. 925 BC – c. 890 BC)

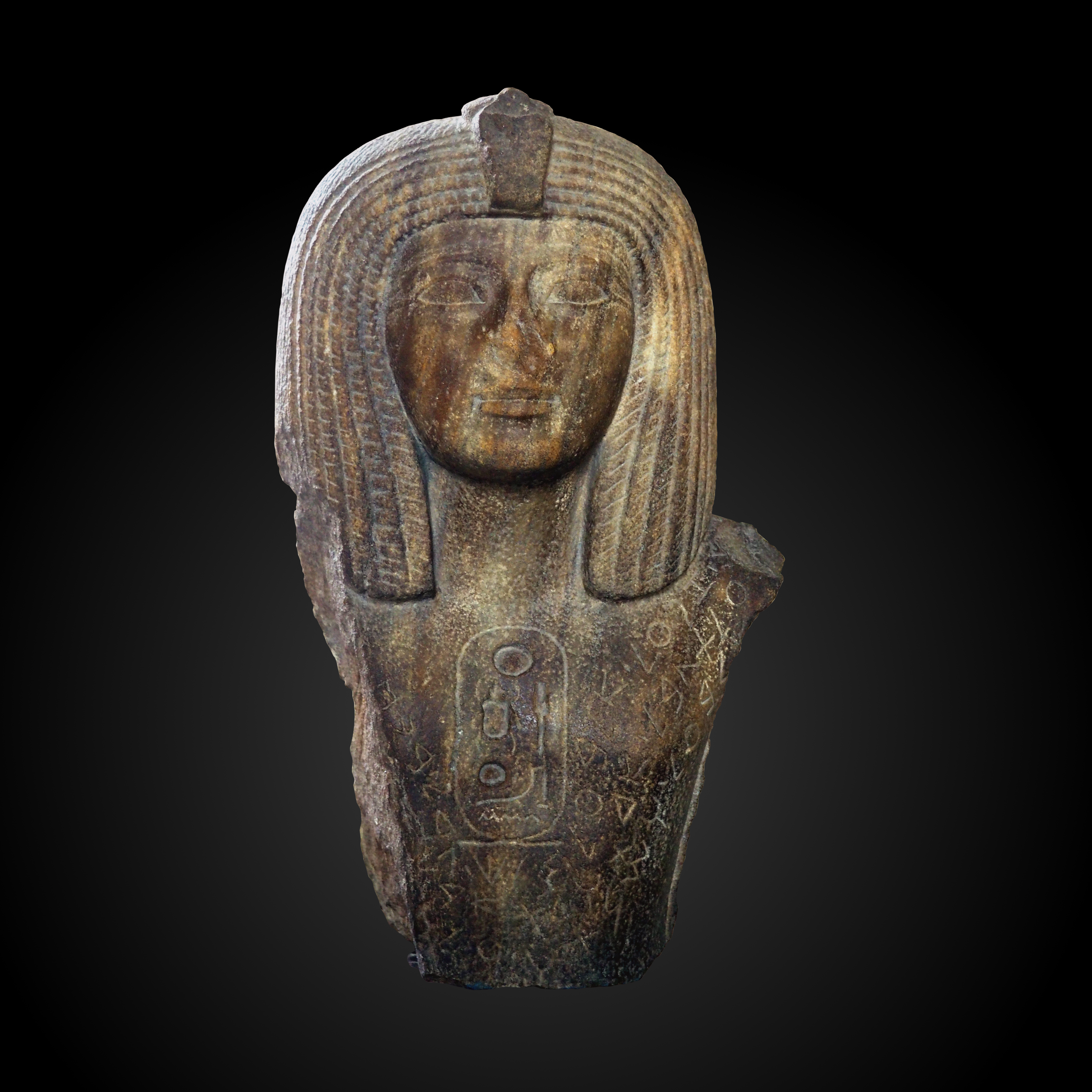
- The Osorkon Bust, inscribed with the pharaoh's praenomen, discovered at Byblos; the statue itself is probably from the 19th Dynasty.

Pharaoh
- Reign: [35] regnal years 922–887 BC
- Predecessor: Shoshenq I
- Successor: Takelot I
Royal titulary
Horus name
Kanakht Merira
kȝnḫt mr-r՚
Strong bull, beloved of Ra
G5	N5 E2 M3 D40 U6
Prenomen
Sekhemkheperre Setepenre
sḫm-ḫpr-r՚ stp-n-r՚
Powerful are the manifestations of Ra, the chosen one of Ra
M23 X1 L2 t < N5 S42 L1 N5 stp n >
Nomen
Userken Meriamun
wsr.kn-mri-jmn
Osorkon, beloved of Amun

G39 N5	i mn n N36 V4 Aa18 M17 D21 N29 N35
- Consorts: Maatkare B Tashedkhonsu; Tasherenese
- Children: Shoshenq Q Iuwelot; Smendes III; Takelot I Sithorkhenem A Djedptahiufankh B
- Father: Shoshenq I
- Mother: Karomama A
- Died: 887 BC
- Dynasty: 22nd Dynasty

Sekhemkheperre Osorkon I was an ancient Egyptian pharaoh of the 22nd Dynasty. Osorkon's territory included much of the Levant. He was the second king of ancient Egypt's 22nd Dynasty who ruled around 922 BC – 887 BC.

== Family ==
According to the stela of Pasenhor, Osorkon I was the son of Shoshenq I and his chief consort Karomama A.

Osorkon I married Maatkare B, king's daughter of Psusennes II of the 21st Dynasty, giving birth to Shoshenq-Meryamun (Shoshenq Q). During the reign of Osorkon I, Shoshenq Q served as the High Priest of Amun at Thebes.

== Reign ==
=== Accession ===
Shoshenq I is thought to have reigned for 21 regnal years. Osorkon I succeeded his father.

=== Activity ===
Osorkon I's reign is known for many temple building projects and was a long and prosperous period of Egypt's history.

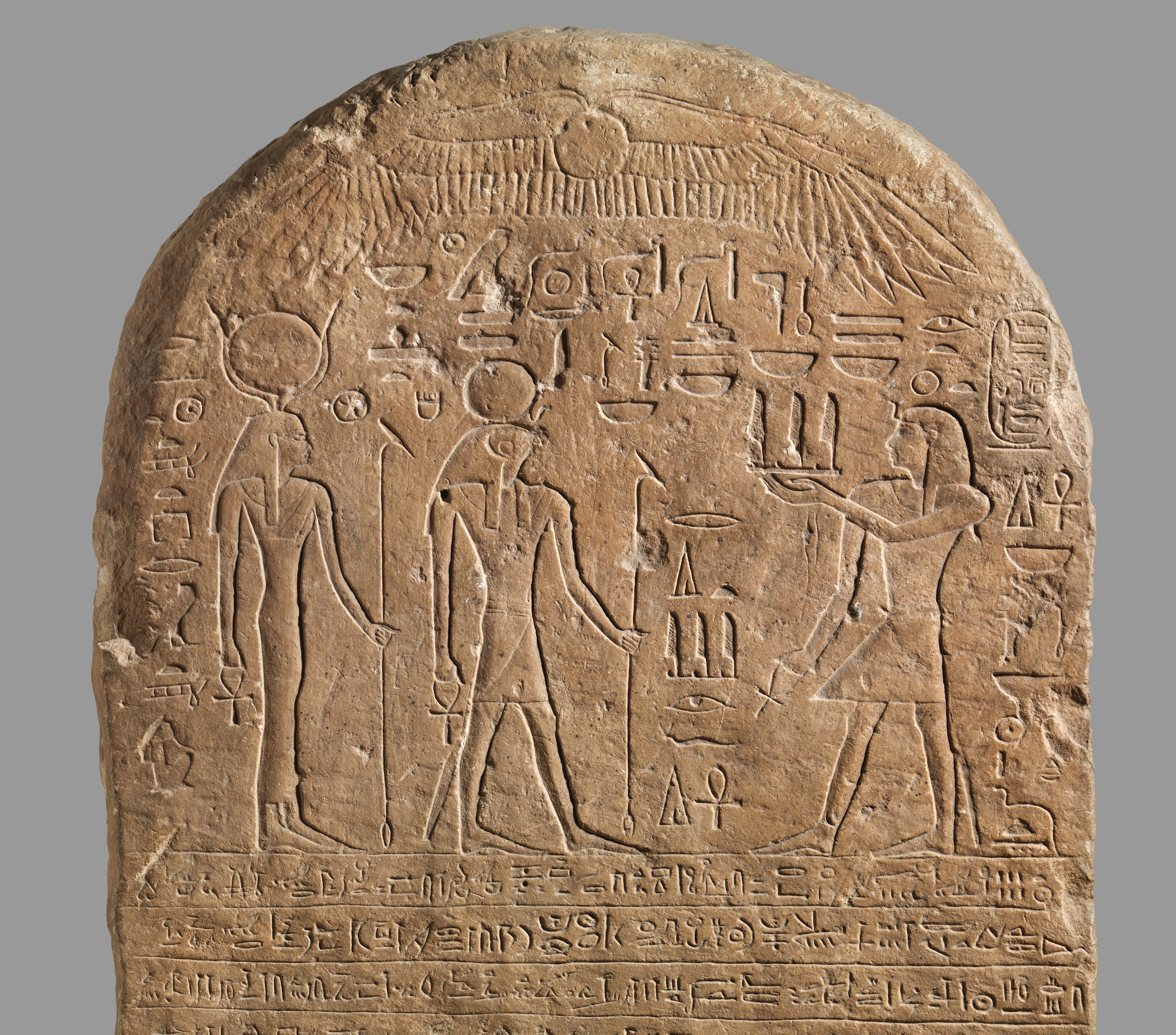
Donation Stela of Osorkon I dated to year 6

In Year 6, the Donation Stela of Osorkon I (The Met Stela) depicts Osorkon I offering a hieroglyph for "field" to the gods Re-Harakhty and Nebet-Hetepet. It records a donation of land in the Heliopolis region, where Djet-tah-iuf-ankh is commanded to make a donation of fields to the Divine Father and Mayor of Heliopolis, Hori.

In Year 12, a Karnak Quay (Nile Level Record No. 2, +0.09 m).

Mummy linens, which belong to his reign, include three separate bandages dating to his regnal years 11, 12, and 23 on the mummy of Khonsmaakheru in Berlin. The bandages are anonymously dated but definitely belong to his reign because Khonsmaakheru wore leather bands that contained a menat-tab naming Osorkon I. Secondly, no other king who ruled around Osorkon I's reign had a 23rd regnal year including Shoshenq I who died just before the beginning of his 22nd.

His highest known date is a "Year 33" date found on the bandage of Nakhtefmut's mummy, which held a menat-tab necklace inscribed with Osorkon I's nomen and prenomen: Osorkon Sekhemkheperre. This date can only belong to Osorkon I since no other early Dynasty 22 king ruled for close to 30 years until Osorkon II.

At Shibin El Qanater, a Statuette of Osorkon I in bronze and gold with names of Osorkon I, the images of the gods Re-Horakhty and Thoth.

==== The Levant ====
At Byblos, the Osorkon Bust found is one of the five Byblian royal inscriptions.

=== Succession ===
In Year [35], Osorkon I died at an advanced age and was succeeded by Takelot I.

==== Reign length ====
While Manetho gives Osorkon I a reign of 15 years in his Ægyptiaca, this is most likely an error for 35 years based on the evidence of the second Heb Sed bandage, as Kenneth Kitchen notes. Osorkon I's throne name, Sekhemkheperre, means "Powerful are the Manifestations of Re".

Manetho's Epitome states that "3 Kings for 25 years" separate Osorkon I from a Takelot (Takelothis). This could be an error on Manetho's part or an allusion to Shoshenq II's reign. It may also be a reference to the recently discovered early Dynasty 22 king Tutkheperre Shoshenq, whose existence is now corroborated by an architectural block from the Great Temple of Bubastis, where Osorkon I and Osorkon II are well attested monumentally.

An "illusory Year 36" has been debated.

== Death ==
=== Tomb ===
Osorkon I's tomb has never been found.

=== Aftermath ===
Osorkon I's reign in Egypt was peaceful and uneventful; however, both his son and grandson, Takelot I and Osorkon II respectively, later encountered difficulties controlling Thebes and Upper Egypt within their own reigns since they had to deal with a rival king: Harsiese A.

== Theories ==
Although Osorkon I is thought to have been directly succeeded by his son Takelot I, it is possible that another ruler, Heqakheperre Shoshenq II, intervened briefly between these two kings because Takelot I was a son of Osorkon I through Queen Tashedkhons, a secondary wife of this king. In contrast, Osorkon I's senior wife was Queen Maatkare B, who may have been Shoshenq II's mother. However, Shoshenq II could also have been another son of Shoshenq I since the latter was the only other king to be mentioned in objects from Shoshenq II's intact royal tomb at Tanis aside from Shoshenq II himself. These objects are inscribed with either Shoshenq I's praenomen Hedjkheperre Shoshenq (though this is not certain as it requires reading the objects as a massive hieroglyphic text), or Shoshenq, Great Chief of the Meshwesh, which was Shoshenq I's title before he became king. Since Derry's forensic examination of his mummy reveals him to be a man in his fifties upon his death, Shoshenq II could have lived beyond Osorkon's 35-year reign and Takelot I's 13-year reign to assume the throne for a few years. An argument against this hypothesis is that most kings of the period were commonly named after their grandfathers, and not their fathers.

While the British scholar Kenneth A. Kitchen views Shoshenq II to be the high priest of Amun at Thebes Shoshenq Q, and a short-lived coregent of Osorkon I who predeceased his father, the German Egyptologist Jürgen von Beckerath in his 1997 book Chronologie des Pharaonischen Ägypten maintains that Shoshenq II was rather an independent king of Tanis who ruled the 22nd Dynasty in his own right for about two years. Von Beckerath's hypothesis is supported by Shoshenq II's employment of a complete royal titulary along with a distinct prenomen Heqakheperre and his intact tomb at Tanis was filled with numerous treasures including jeweled pectorals and bracelets, an impressive falcon-headed silver coffin and a gold face mask—items which indicate a genuine king of the 22nd Dynasty. More significantly, however, no mention of Osorkon I's name was preserved on any ushabtis, jars, jewelry or other objects within Shoshenq II's tomb. This situation would be improbable if he was indeed Osorkon I's son, and was buried by his father, as Kitchen's chronology suggests. These facts, taken together, imply that Sheshonq II ruled on his own accord at Tanis and was not a mere coregent.

== See also ==
- Pi-Sekhemkheperre – a now-lost stronghold in Middle Egypt, founded by Osorkon I

== Gallery ==
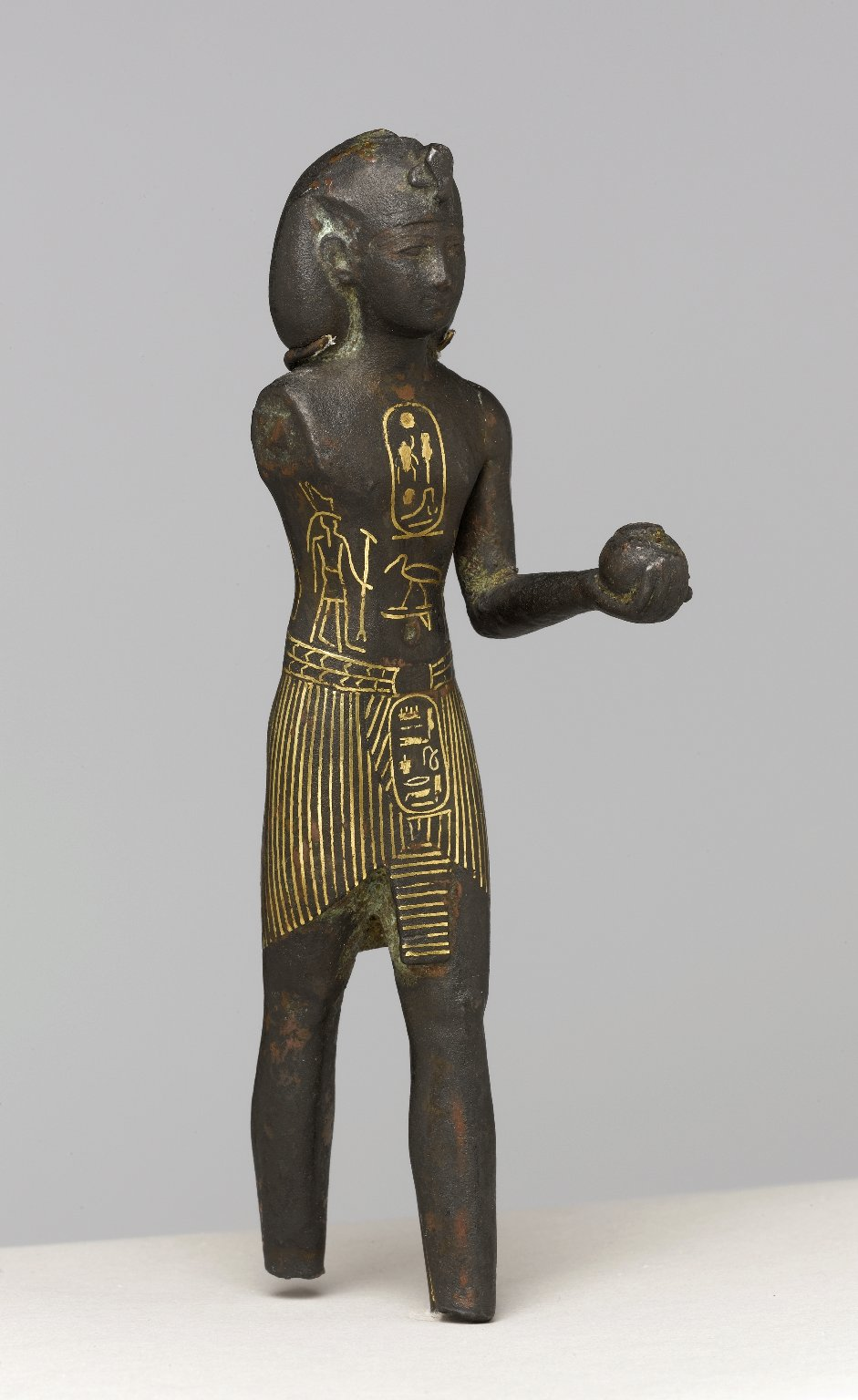
King Osorkon I, c. 924–889 BC Brooklyn Museum

== Bibliography ==
- El-Alfi, Mostafa, "A Donation Stela from the time of Osorkon I", Discussions in Egyptology 24 (1992), pp. 13-19.
- Altenmüller, Hartwig, "Lederbänder und Lederanhänger von der Mumie des Chonsu-maacheru" and "Die Mumienbinden des Chonsu-maacheru" in Alt-Ägypten 30 (2000), pp. 73–76, 88–89, 102–114. doi:10.11588/propylaeumdok.00001571. doi:10.11588/propylaeumdok.00001567.
- Jürgen von Beckerath, Chronologie des Pharaonischen Ägypten or 'Chronology of the Egyptian Pharaohs', (Mainz: 1997), Philip Zon Zabern
- Clayton, Peter A., Chronology of the Pharaohs, Thames & Hudson Ltd, (1994)
- Kitchen, Kenneth A., The Third Intermediate Period in Egypt (1100–650 BC) 4th ed, [1986] (Warminster: 2009), Aris & Phillips Limited
- Jaquet-Gordon, Helen K., The illusory year 36 of osorkon I, JEA 53 (1967), pp. 63–68.
- Lange, Eva, "Ein Neuer König Schoschenk in Bubastis", GM 203 (2004), pp. 65–71.
- Lange, Eva, "Legitimation und Herrschaft in der Libyerzeit", Zeitschrift für Ägyptische Sprache und Altertumskunde 135 (2008), pp. 131-141.
