= 11th century BC =

One hundred years, from 1100 BC to 1001 BC

The 11th century BC comprises all years from 1100 BC to 1001 BC. Although many human societies were literate in this period, some of the individuals mentioned below may be apocryphal rather than historically accurate.

== The world in the 11th century BC ==
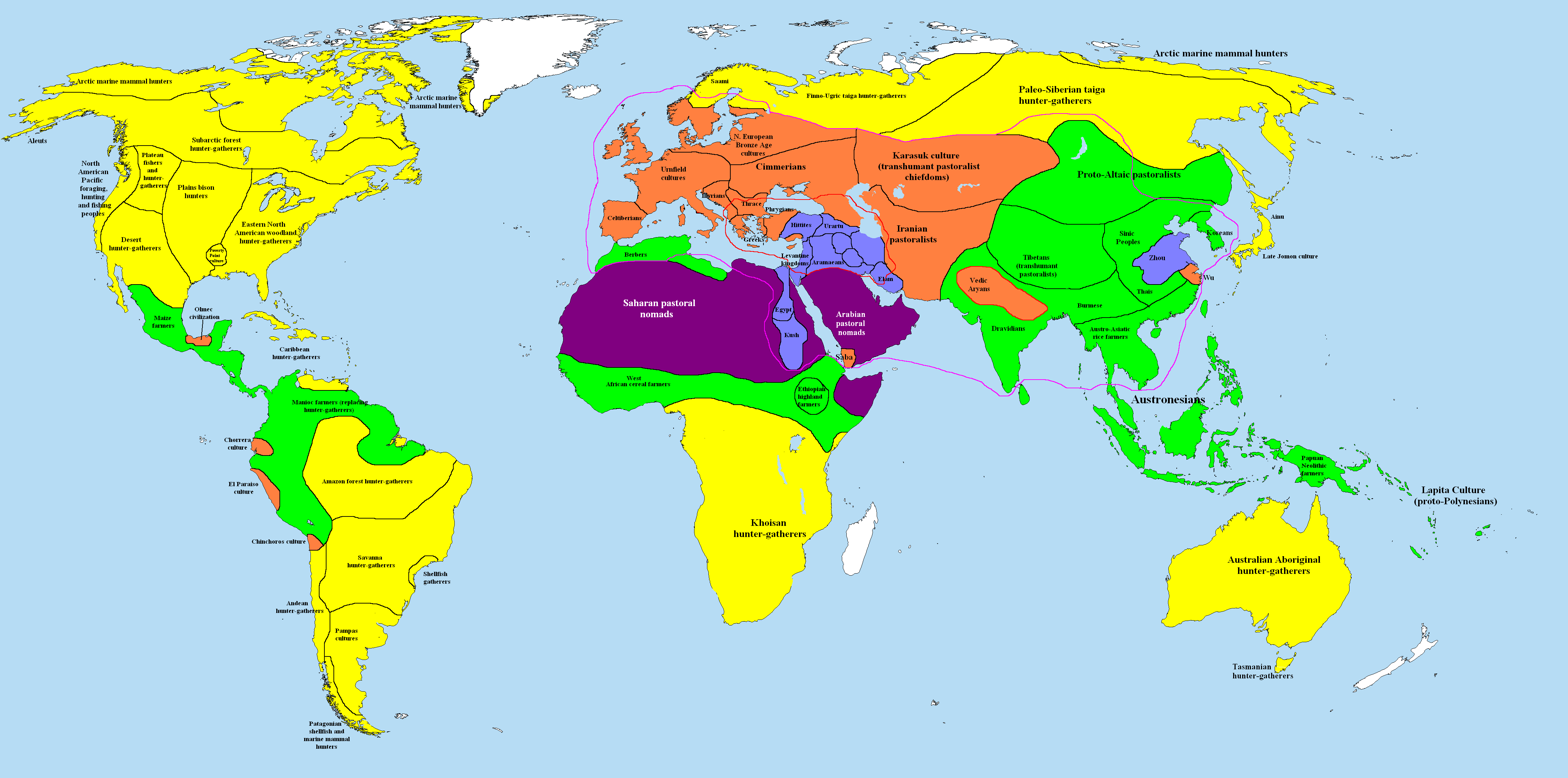
The world in 1000 BCE.

== Events ==
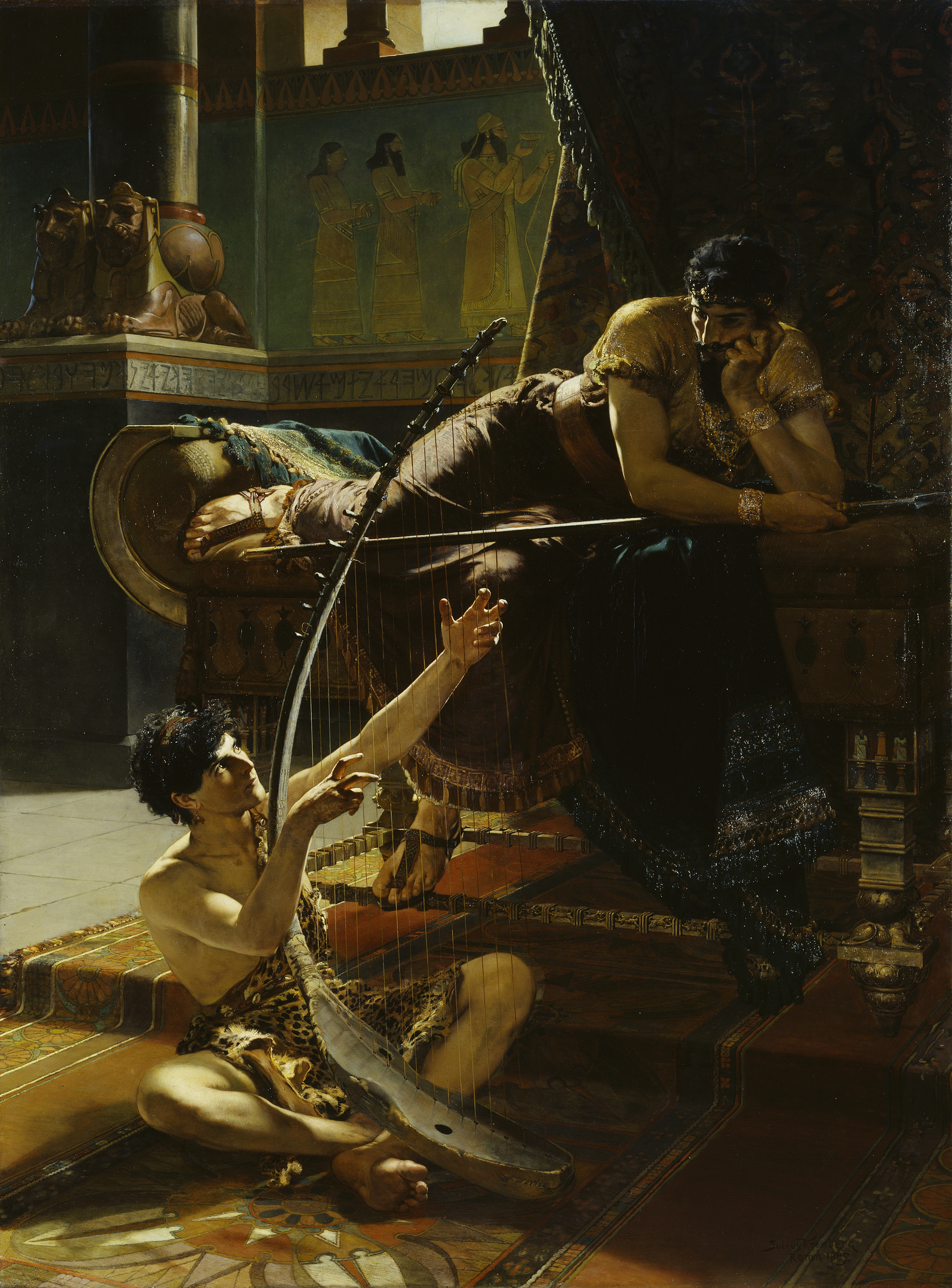
David and Saul (1885) by Julius Kronberg. The two men are considered the first Kings of the United Monarchy of Israel

- 1089 BC: Melanthus, legendary King of Athens, dies after a reign of 37 years and is succeeded by his son Codrus.
- 1069 BC: Ramesses XI dies, ending the Twentieth Dynasty. He is succeeded by Smendes I, who founds the Twenty-first Dynasty.
- 1068 BC: Codrus, legendary King of Athens, dies in battle against Dorian invaders after a reign of 21 years. Athenian tradition considers him the last king to have held absolute power. Modern historians consider him the last king whose life account is part of Greek mythology. He is succeeded by his son Medon.
- 1059 BC: In May the five planets Mercury, Venus, Mars, Jupiter, and Saturn gathered close together in the evening sky. This is mentioned in the Bamboo Annals and was considered significant in connexion with the subsequent replacement of the Shang dynasty by the Zhou dynasty.
- 1050 BC: Philistines capture the Ark of the Covenant from Israel in battle. (Approximate date)
- 1048 BC: Medon, King of Athens, dies after a reign of 20 years and is succeeded by his son Acastus.
- 1046 BC: King Wu of Zhou overthrows the last Shang dynasty king Di Xin and becomes first king of the Zhou dynasty (1046 BC—256 BC) founded by his father King Wen of Zhou.
- 1044 BC: On the death of Smendes I, king of Egypt, he is succeeded by two co-regents, Psusennes I and Neferkare Amenemnisu.
- 1042 BC: King Cheng of Zhou succeeds King Wu as ruler of the Zhou dynasty in China.
- c. 1040 BC: David, King of Israel, is born.
- 1039 BC: Neferkare Amenemnisu, king of Egypt, dies.
- 1026 BC: Saul becomes the first king of the Israelites, according to the Books of Samuel.
- c. 1020 BC: Destruction of Troy VIIb_{2}.
- 1020 BC: King Kang of Zhou succeeds King Cheng as ruler of the Zhou dynasty in China.
- 1012 BC: Acastus, King of Athens, dies after a reign of 36 years and is succeeded by his son Archippus.
- 1000s BC: Earliest evidence of farming in the Kenya highlands.
- 1000s BC: Phoenician alphabet invented.
- c. 1010 BC: David succeeds Ish-bosheth.
- c. 1000 BC: Latins arrive in Italy.

== Sovereign states ==
See: List of sovereign states in the 11th century BC.
