= Isetemkheb =

Isetemkheb (Asetemakhbit) is the name of several noble and royal women from Ancient Egypt.

Q1 t H8 Aa15 L2 M15 B1
Isetemkheb
in hieroglyphs

- Isetemkheb A, Chief of the Harem of Amun-Re, Wife of Pinedjem I (21st Dynasty)
- Isetemkheb B, Chief of the Harem of Min, possibly the daughter of Masaharta (21st Dynasty)
- Isetemkheb C, First Chief of the Harem of Amun-Re, Wife of Menkheperre and daughter of Psusennes I and Wiay. (21st Dynasty)
- Isetemkheb D, Chief of the Harem of Amun-Re, daughter of Menkheperre and sister-wife of Pinedjem II. (21st Dynasty)
- Isetemkheb E, daughter of Henuttawy C. (21st Dynasty)
- Isetemkheb G, Wife of Osorkon II (22nd Dynasty)
- Isetemkheb H, Great Royal Wife, King's Sister, King's Daughter. Daughter of Shabaka and likely wife of Tanutamun. (25th Dynasty)
- Isetemkheb Q, Mother of Tjanefer (21st Dynasty)
- Isetemkheb R, King's Daughter. Daughter of Necho II. (26th Dynasty)
