= Pinedjem =

pA Z4 nDm
Pinedjem
in hieroglyphs
Era: New Kingdom
(1550–1069 BC)

Pinedjem (“the pleasant one”) was the name of two ancient Egyptian High Priests of Amun.

- Pinedjem I
- Pinedjem II, his grandson

There was also a Fourth Prophet of Amun by this name, a son of Tjanefer and Gautseshen.
