= 1021 (disambiguation) =

AD 1021 (MXXI) was a common year starting on Sunday of the Julian calendar.

1021 or variations may also refer to:

- 1021 (number)

== Chronology ==
- 1021 BCE, or 1021 B.C., the 1021st year before the Common Era

== Places ==
- 1021 Flammario, the 1021st asteroid catalogued

== Legislation ==
- United Nations Security Council Resolution 1021
- Philippine Proclamation 1021

== Objects by number ==
- USS Courtney (DE-1021), US Navy destroyer escort #1021
- German submarine U-1021, Nazi Germany Kriegsmarine U-boat #1021
- Falcon 9 booster B1021, SpaceX Falcon 9 first stage booster core #1021
- Farman F.1021, an experimental aircraft from 1930s France

== Other uses ==
- Code page 1021 (CH7DEC), a computer character set, the Swiss variant of DEC's National Replacement Character Set (NRCS)

== See also ==
- 21 (disambiguation)
