= Djedkhonsuefankh =

Egyptian High Priest of Amun

- High Priest of Amun
- Tenure: 1046–1045 BC
- Predecessor: Masaharta
- Successor: Menkheperre
- Spouse: Djedmutesankh (?)
- Father: Pinedjem I

Djedkhonsuefankh was a High Priest of Amun in Thebes believed to have been in office from 1046–1045 BC.

== High Priesthood ==
It is often assumed that he was a son of Pinedjem I who succeeded his brother Masaherta during a time of great turmoil in the city of Thebes. Jürgen von Beckerath has even suggested that it is possible that he died a violent death, accounting for his very short reign. Kenneth Kitchen considered this possibility as well, but also stated that "this may be an over-dramatic interpretation of his brief rule".

All we actually know of his existence is the bare mention of his name on the now–lost coffin of his son. There it reads, according to Cecil Torr: "[...]re, son of the first prophet of Amun, Djed-Khons-ef-ankh, son of the Lord of the Two Lands, Pinedjem, Beloved of Amun, first prophet of Amun", with the name Pinedjem enclosed in a cartouche.

Djedkhonsuefankh is supposed to have been succeeded as High Priest by his brother Menkheperre, which seems to imply that his son "[...]re" either predeceased him, was too young to succeed or was simply passed over for other reasons.

Djedkhonsuefankh's wife is likely to have been Djedmutesankh, a Singer of Amun, who was buried in Tomb MMA60 in Deir el-Bahari.

== Theories ==
However, Andrzej Niwiński has suggested that Djedkhonsuefankh was not the son of Pinedjem I, but rather of Pinedjem II, and as such the great grandson of Pinedjem I Niwiński identifies him with the main official mentioned with the burials of Neskhons in year 5 of king Siamun and of Pinedjem II in year 10 of the same king. He postulates that Psusennes II (in this model his brother), who probably succeeded his father Pinedjem II as High Priest and succeeded in uniting this title with that of king had Djedkhonsuefankh act as his deputy in Thebes. The title of High Priest on his coffin would then be given posthumously by his son "[...]re"

Niwiński also points out that theophoric names as Djedkhonsuefankh mainly appear very late in the 21st Dynasty.
