= Smendes (name) =

ns n E10 Dd Dd A52
Nesubanebdjed
in hieroglyphs

Smendes is the Hellenized form of the ancient Egyptian name Nesubanebdjed or Nesubanebdjedet (nỉ-sw-b3-nb-ḏd.t; 'He belongs to Banebdjed'). Known bearers of the name include:

- Smendes, pharaoh of the 21st dynasty;
- Smendes II, High Priest of Amun during the 21st dynasty;
- Smendes III, High Priest of Amun during the 22nd dynasty;
- Nesubanebdjed, a palace official, married to the sister of Nectanebo I.

== See also ==
- Sam Mendes
