= MMA 60 =

Ancient Egyptian tomb

Theban Tomb MMA 60
- Burial site of Cache Tomb
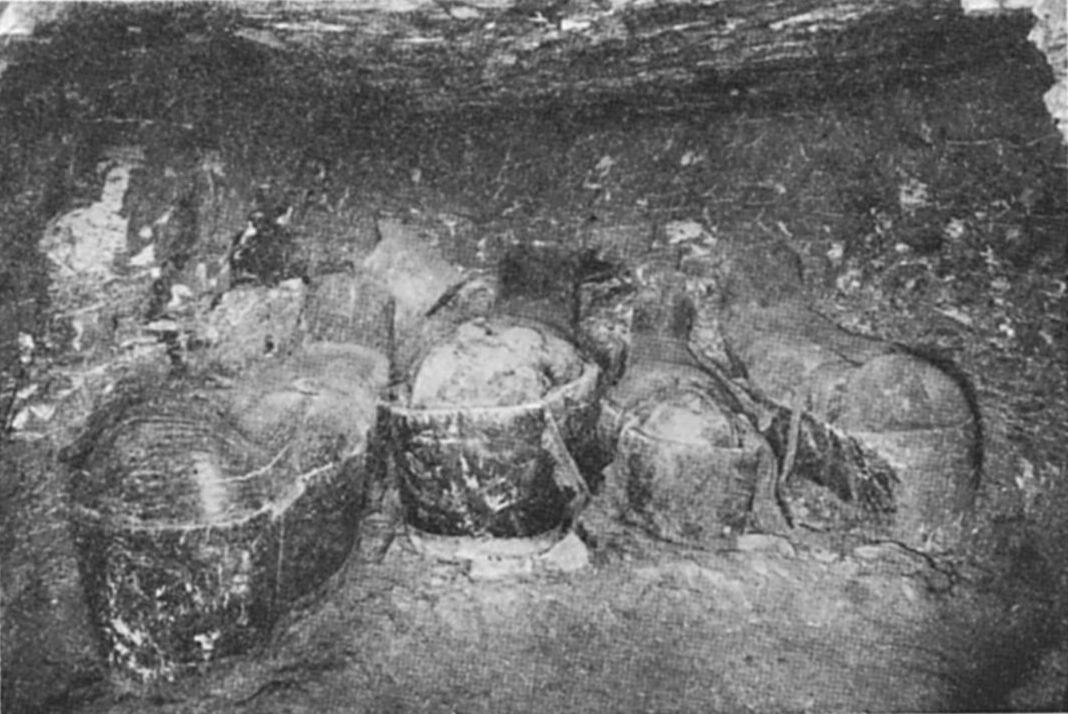
- Location: Deir el-Bahari
- Discovered: Twenty-first Dynasty of Egypt
- Excavated by: Discovered and excavated by Winlock during the 1923–24 season
- Decoration: none

The Theban Tomb known as MMA 60 is located in Deir el-Bahari. It forms part of the Theban Necropolis, situated on the west bank of the Nile opposite Luxor. The tomb is the burial place several high ranking individuals dating to the 21st Dynasty.

== People buried in MMA 60 ==
- Djedmutesankh A – Chief of the Harem of Amun.
- Henuttawy B – Daughter of Pinedjem I and Duathathor-Henuttawy
- Henuttawy C – Chief of the Harem of Amun, Flutist of Mut, and God's Mother of Khonsu, probably a daughter of the Theban High Priest of Amun Menkheperre and of Isetemkheb C
- Menkheperre C – God's Father, Priest of Amun-Re, son of Fai-en-Mut, grandson of Piankh
- Ankhesmut
- Tabeketmut
- Nesenaset – Chantress of Amun
- Tiye – Chantress of Amun
- Gautsoshen A – Chief of the Harem of Montu. Buried in Pit 4. Daughter of the High Priest Menkheperre and wife of Tjanefer A.

The original burial was for the three ladies Djedmutesankh A, Henuttawy B and Henuttawy C. The tomb was later reopened and the Priest of Amun Menkheperre was buried alongside the three women. The tomb would continue to be reopened and further burials would be made, including Tabeketmut and Ankhesmut.

== See also ==
- List of MMA Tombs
