= Masaharta =

High Priest of Amun (1100–1045 BC)

- High Priest of Amun
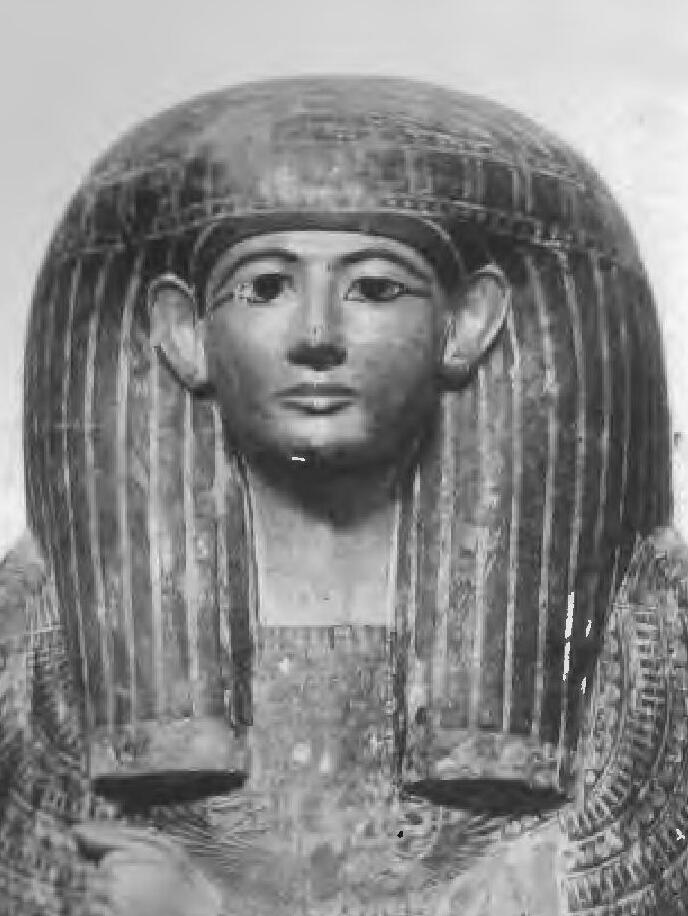
- Coffin of Masaharta, found in DB320
- Tenure: 1054–1045 BC
- Predecessor: Pinedjem I
- Successor: Djedkhonsuefankh
- Spouse: Tayuheret(?)
- Father: Pinedjem I
- Mother: Duathathor-Henuttawy(?)

Masaharta or Masaherta was the High Priest of Amun at Thebes between 1054 and 1045 BC.

== Biography ==
His father was Pinedjem I, who was the Theban High Priest of Amun and de facto ruler of Upper Egypt from 1070 BC, then declared himself pharaoh in 1054 BC and Masaharta succeeded him as high priest. His mother was probably Duathathor-Henuttawy, the daughter of Ramesses XI, last ruler of the 20th dynasty. His aunt Tentamun, another daughter of Ramesses married Pharaoh Smendes I, who ruled Lower Egypt. One of Masaharta's brothers was Psusennes I, who followed Smendes's successor, the short-lived Amenemnisu as pharaoh.

His wife is likely to have been the Singer of Amun Tayuheret, whose mummy was found in the Deir el-Bahri cachette. It is possible that he had a daughter called Isetemkheb, since a lady by this name is called the daughter of a high priest on her funerary objects; it is also possible, though, that she was Menkheperre's daughter.

The God's Wife of Amun during Masaharta's reign seems to have been his sister Maatkare.

== Sources ==
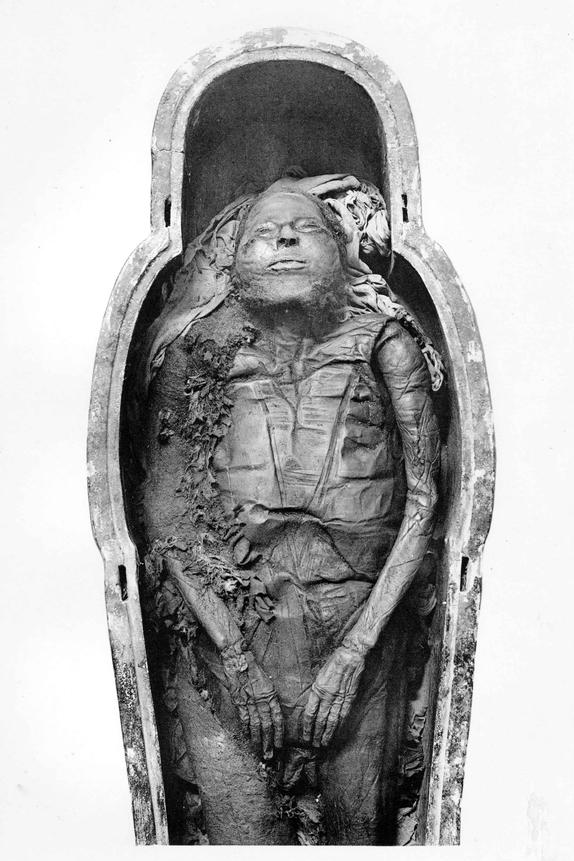
Mummy of Masaharta

Several of his inscriptions are known from the Karnak temple of Amenhotep II, from ram-headed sphinxes also in Karnak, and a large falcon statue.

Masaharta was responsible for the restoration of the mummy of Amenhotep I in the 16th regnal year of Smendes. He is also mentioned in Theban Graffito no. 1572, from a year 16, together with the King's Scribe in the Place of Truth (= Scribe of the Necropolis) Ankhefenamun, the son of King's Scribe Butehamun.

His highest attested year is a year 18. It is sometimes derived from the combination of two letters found in el-Hiba, the first mentioning an untitled Masaharta praying for his health, and the second a letter of thanks to the local god by the High Priest Menkheperre, that Masaharta died of illness at el-Hiba around the 24th regnal year of Smendes, but this is no more than an unproven hypothesis. In fact, it has been pointed out that such a scenario ill fits the content of the letters.

His mummy was found in the Deir el-Bahri cache along with several family members; it is now in the Mummification Museum in Luxor.

== The succession ==
It is often assumed that he was succeeded as high priest by his brother Djedkhonsuefankh, who served only for a short time and was followed by another brother, Menkheperre. However, the position of Djedkhonsuefankh is not beyond dispute. All we actually know of his existence is the bare mention of his name on the coffin of his son (now lost). There it reads, according to Torr: "[...]re, son of the first prophet of Amun, Djed-Khons-ef-ankh, son of the Lord of the Two Lands, Pinedjem, Beloved of Amun, first prophet of Amun", with the name Pinedjem enclosed in a cartouche.

Djedkhonsuefankh is supposed to have been succeeded as High Priest by his brother Menkheperre, which seems to imply that his son "[...]re" either predeceased him, was too young to succeed or was simply passed over for other reasons.

However, Andrzej Niwiński has suggested that Djedkhonsuefankh was not the son of Pinedjem I, but rather of Pinedjem II, and as such the great grandson of Pinedjem I Niwiński identifies him with the main official mentioned with the burials of Neskhons in year 5 of king Siamun and of Pinedjem II in year 10 of the same king. He postulates that Psusennes II (in this model his brother), who probably succeeded his father Pinedjem II as High Priest and succeeded in uniting this title with that of king had Djed-Khons-ef-ankh act as his deputy in Thebes. The title of High Priest on his coffin would then be given posthumously by his son "[...]re"

Niwiński also points out that theophoric names as Djed-Khons-ef-ankh mainly appear very late in the 21st Dynasty.

If we disregard the ephemeral Djedkhonsuefankh, it seems that Masaharta was succeeded by his brother Menkheperre.
