= 1040s BC =

Decade

The 1040s BC is a decade that lasted from 1049 BC to 1040 BC.

== Events and trends ==
- 1048 BC—Medon, King of Athens, dies after a reign of 20 years and is succeeded by his son Acastus.
- 1046 BC—Following the Battle of Muye, King Wu of Zhou overthrows the Shang dynasty under the Chinese King Di Xin, and establishes the Zhou dynasty (1046 BC–256 BC).
- 1044 BC—On the death of Smendes I, king of Egypt, he is succeeded by two co-regents, Psusennes I and Neferkare Amenemnisu.
- c. 1042 BC—Beginning of the Rebellion of the Three Guards. Guanshu Xian and Caishu Du instigate Shang loyalists under Wu Geng to revolt.
- 1041 BC—Some sources propose this as the date of King David's birth

== Significant people ==
- Shu Du of Cai
- Ashur-rabi II, king of Assyria, is born (approximate date).
