= Henuttawy C =

Egyptian priestess, wife of Smendes II

- Chantress of Amun
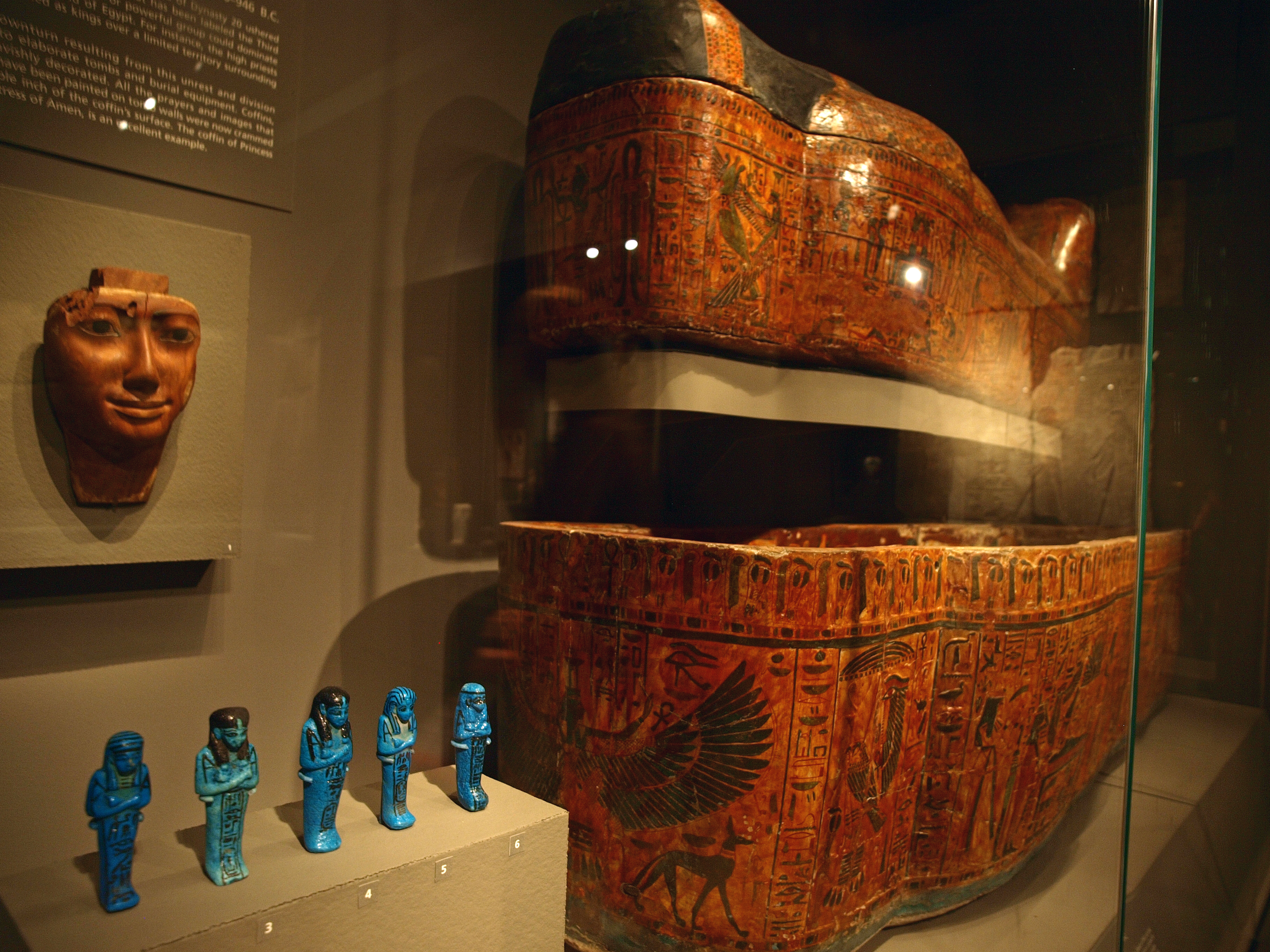
- Coffins of Henuttawy C. Museum of Fine Arts, Boston.
- Dynasty: 21st Dynasty
- Pharaoh: Siamun(?) and others
- Burial: Deir el-Bahari, Tomb MMA 60
- Father: Menkheperre(?)
- Mother: Isetemkheb C
- Children: Isetemkheb E

Henuttawy or Henettawy, was an ancient Egyptian princess and priestess during the 21st Dynasty.

== Biography ==
Henuttawy was probably a daughter of the Theban High Priest of Amun Menkheperre and of Isetemkheb C, herself daughter of pharaoh Psusennes I. She likely married her brother Smendes II who became High Priest of Amun after his father's death. The couple had at least a daughter, Isetemkheb E.
She holds many titles such as Chantress of Amun, Mistress of the House, Chief of the Harim of Amun, Flautist of Mut, God's Mother of Khonsu. Henuttawy died as an elderly woman around her 70s, and was buried in the Deir el-Bahari necropolis near the Mortuary Temple of Hatshepsut. Her tomb (MMA 60) was plundered in antiquity, and was rediscovered in 1923-24 by an expedition led by Herbert E. Winlock. The jewelry was long gone but the mummy, coffins and part of the funerary equipment were taken to the Metropolitan Museum of Art where these are exhibited today. Later, some of Henuttawy's coffin were given to the Boston Museum of Fine Arts (acc. no. 54.639-40).

According to Kenneth Kitchen, she is likely the same Henuttawy who is mentioned as the beneficiary of a decree carved on the Tenth Pylon of the Precinct of Amun-Ra at Karnak, and issued in years 5, 6 and 8 of an unnamed king – possibly Siamun – when the High Priest of Amun at Thebes was Smendes II's successor, Pinedjem II. The inscriptions did not mentions any title but from these is clear that Henuttawy and her daughter Isetemkheb inherited the property of a man named Smendes, likely the former's defunct husband (Smendes II).

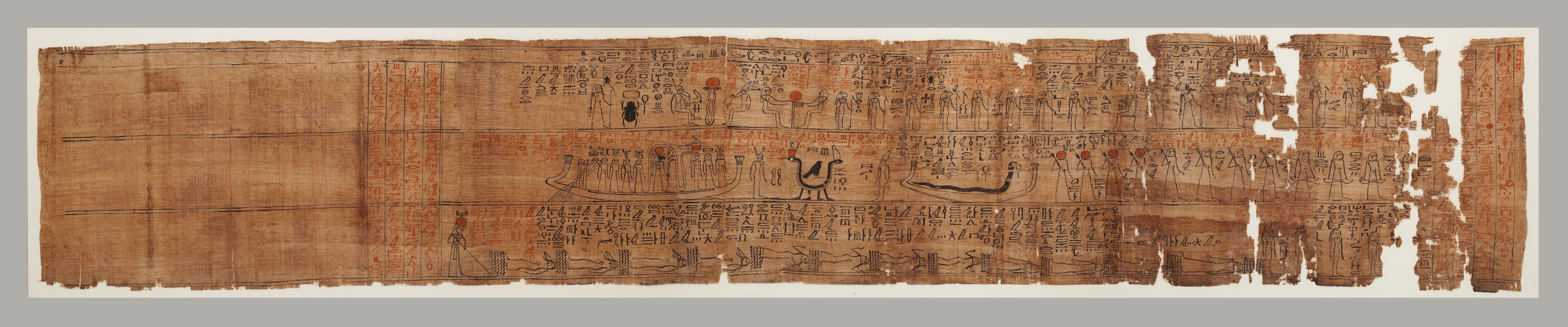
"Amduat" Papyrus of Henettawy, daughter of Isetemkheb. MET
