= Bab el-Gasus =

21st dynasty Egyptian tomb (c. 1070–945 BCE)

Theban tomb Bab el-Gasus
- Burial site of multiple priests
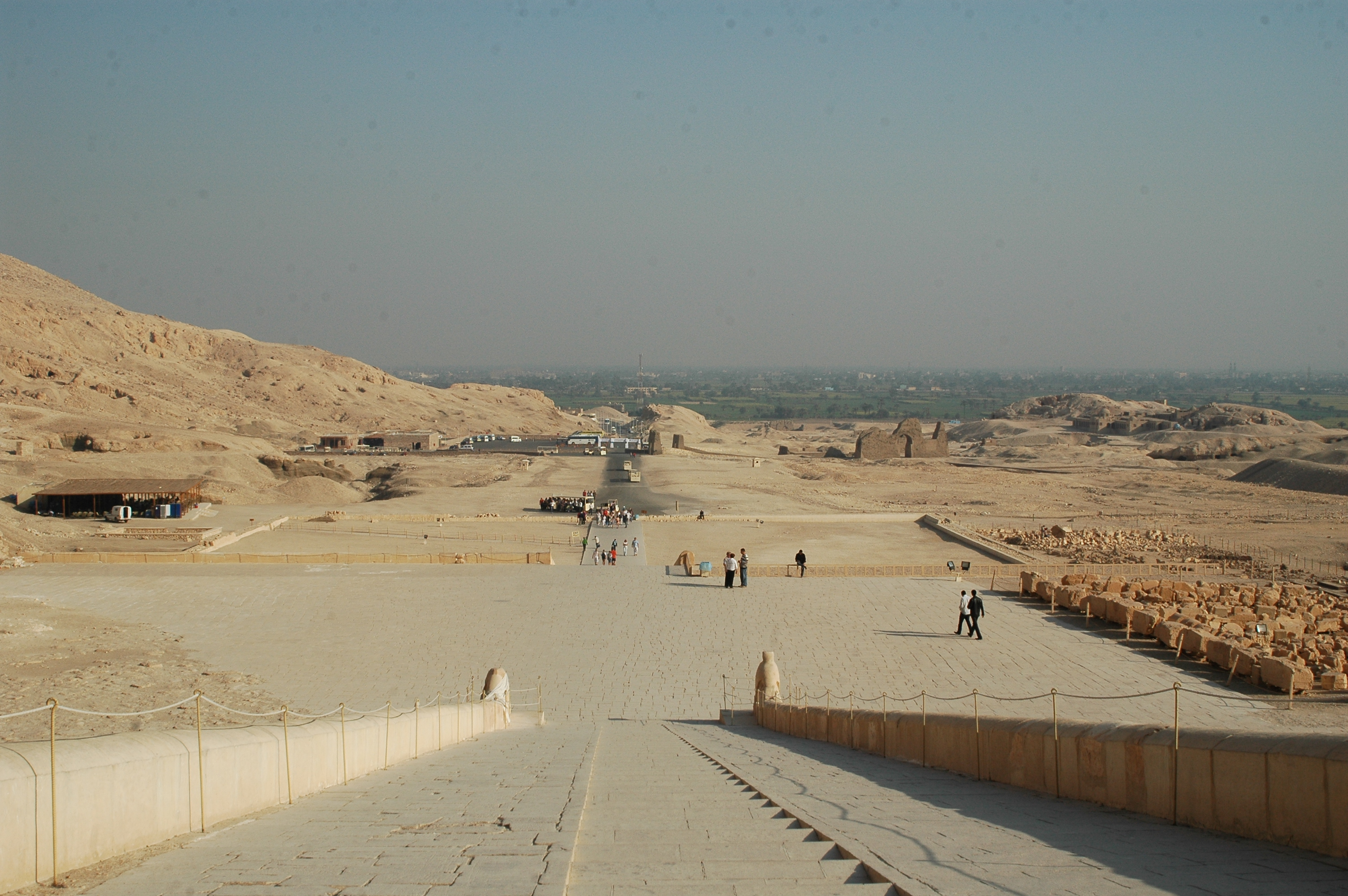
- The entrance to the tomb is on the left of this photo taken from the Mortuary Temple of Hatshepsut

- Location within Egypt
- Coordinates: 25.7379°N 32.6086°E
- Location: Deir el-Bahari, Theban Necropolis
- Discovered: 1891

Bab el-Gasus (Egyptian Arabic: باب الجسس, romanized: bāb el-gasus, lit. 'Gate of the Priests [Spies]'), also known as the Priestly Cache and the Second Cache, was a cache of ancient 21st dynasty (c. 1070–945 BCE) Egyptian mummies found at Deir el-Bahari in 1891. It was excavated by French Egyptologists Eugène Grebaut and Georges Daressy, with Urbain Bouriant and Ahmed Kamal, on the direction of Mohamed Ahmed Abd al‑Rassul, who had also revealed the location of the Royal Cache in 1881. The tomb entrance was located on the flat area just outside the precinct wall in front of the Mortuary Temple of Hatshepsut. The find was significant for Egyptology, particularly in respect of religion, mummification, and coffin studies. It is the largest intact tomb ever found in Egypt. Today, the contents of the tomb are spread between 30 museums worldwide.

In 1893, Khedive Abbas II of Egypt presented groups of artefacts from the tomb to 16 countries, as gifts celebrating the Khedive's accession to the throne. As a result of this dispersion, the artefacts have received limited focus by scholars.

It contained 254 richly decorated coffins (101 double sets) giving 153 coffin sets in total, as well as 110 shabti boxes, 77 Osirian wooden statuettes (mostly hollow and containing a papyrus), 8 wooden steles, 2 large wooden statues (Isis and Nephthys), 16 canopic reed baskets, 5 round baskets made of woven reed. The coffins were made almost exclusively with wood from the native fig tree, the Ficus sycomorus.

On the 125th anniversary of the find, the Centro de Estudos Clássicos e Humanísticos of the University of Coimbra launched the "Gate of the Priests" project, with the University of Leiden, the National Museum of Antiquities of Leiden, the Vatican Museums and UCLA, in order to reconstruct the original collection of Bab el-Gasus.

A new display of the Bab el-Gasus artefacts was opened at the Egyptian Museum in Cairo in 2021 following the moving of the Royal Cache.

Although one of the Theban tombs, the tomb never received a serial number.

== International donations ==
In 1907 Daressy published a list of the 71 coffins sets that were donated overseas in 1893 by Khedive Abbas:

Lot	Location		Sarcophagi sets (Daressy, 1907)		Image	Ref
Lot	Country	Museum	Number	Names	Image	Ref
I	France	Louvre, Musée Bargoin, Château de Boulogne-sur-Mer, Musée de Picardie, Musée d'archéologie méditerranéenne	5			
II	Austria	Kunsthistorisches Museum	5			
III	Turkey	Museum of the Ancient Orient	4			
IV	United Kingdom	British Museum	5			
V	Italy	National Archaeological Museum, Florence (Egyptian Museum)	6			
VI	Russia	Various, including Irkutsk	4			
VII	Germany	Egyptian Museum of Berlin	4			
VIII	Portugal	Lisbon Geographic Society	4			
IX	Switzerland	Kunstmuseum Appenzell, Musée d'Art et d'Histoire (Geneva), Musée d'ethnographie de Neuchâtel, Bern Historical Museum	4			
X	United States	National Museum of Natural History, National Museum of Anthropology (Mexico) (on loan)	4			
XI	Netherlands	Rijksmuseum van Oudheden	4			
XII	Greece	National Archaeological Museum, Athens	4			
XIII	Spain	National Archaeological Museum (Madrid)	4			
XIV	Sweden and Norway	Medelhavsmuseet (Stockholm), Victoriamuseet för egyptiska fornsaker (Uppsala) and Museum of Cultural History, Oslo	4			
XV	Belgium	Art & History Museum, Brussels	4			
XVI	Denmark	National Museum of Denmark	4			
XVII	Vatican	Vatican Museums (Gregorian Egyptian Museum)	2			

Anonymous coffins 75 and 126 were sent to the Museum of Alexandria.

== Burials ==
Burials in the tomb include the following, amongst others:

- Children of Menkheperre
- Children of Pinedjem II
- Gautseshen
- Tjanefer

== List of objects found ==
A list of the objects found was published by Daressy in 1900:

- 153 coffin sets, of which 101 include two coffins and 52 a single coffin
- 110 ushebti-boxes
- 77 wooden statuettes of Osiris, most of them hollowed and holding a papyrus scroll
- 8 wooden stelae
- 2 large wooden statuettes of Isis and Nephthys
- 16 canopic vases
- 1 mat
- 10 baskets of reeds
- 5 round baskets
- 2 fans
- 5 pairs of sandals
- 11 baskets with food (with meat, fruits, etc.)
- 6 baskets with floral garlands
- 5 large vases
- 5 pots
- 1 box with wooden hands and divine beards ripped from coffins

== Gallery ==
=== Initial discovery ===
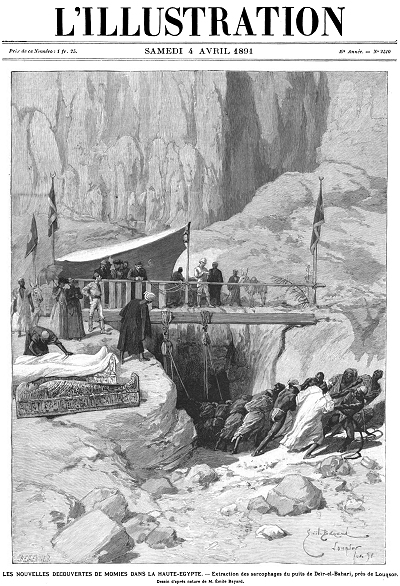
Émile Bayard's sketch on the front cover of L'Illustration on 4 April 1891

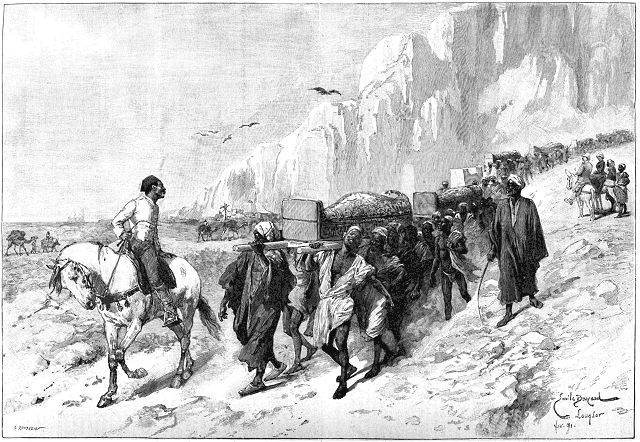
Émile Bayard's second sketch on the topic in L'Illustration on 4 April 1891

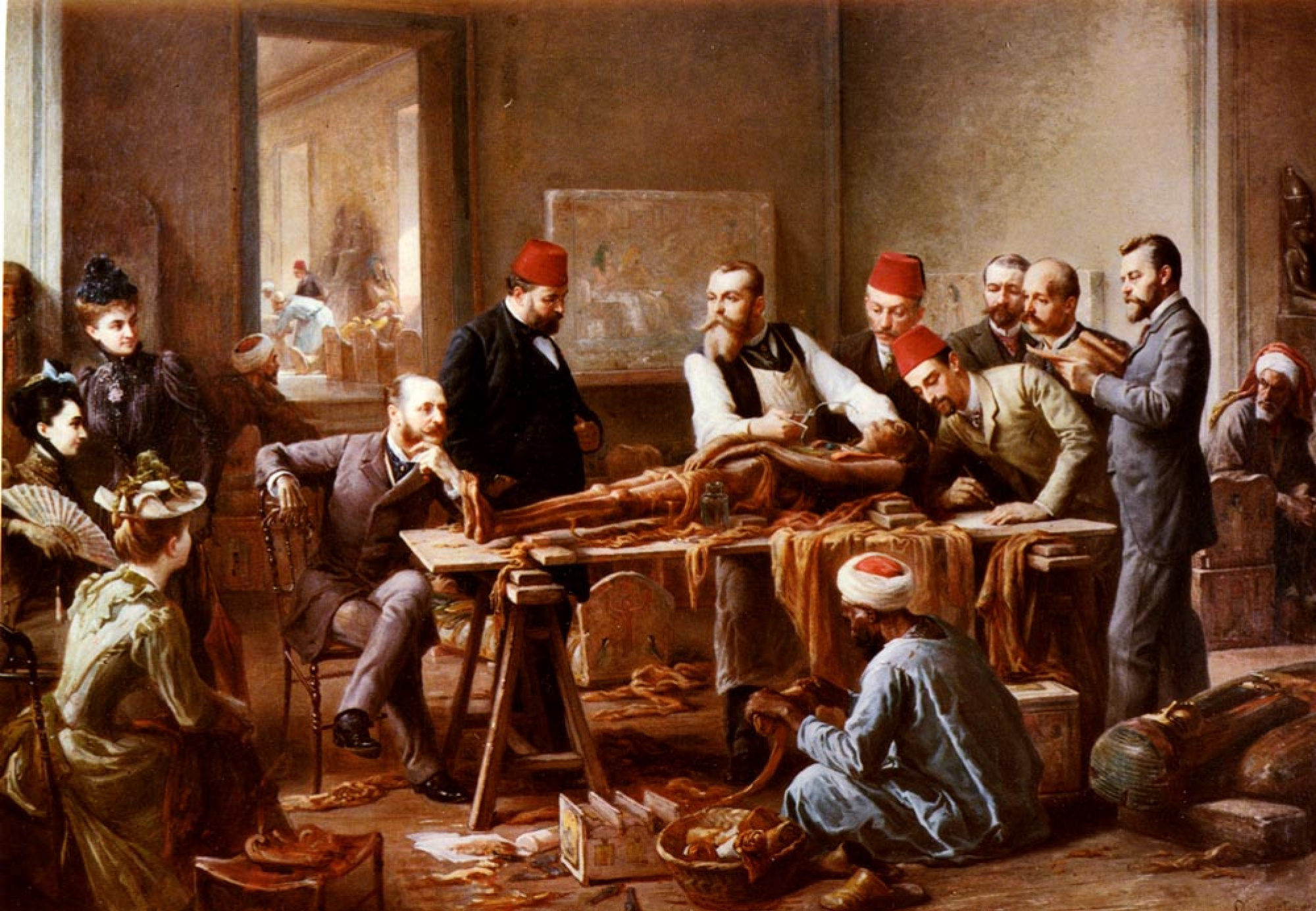
Paul Philippoteaux's Examen d'une momie - Une prêtresse d'Ammon

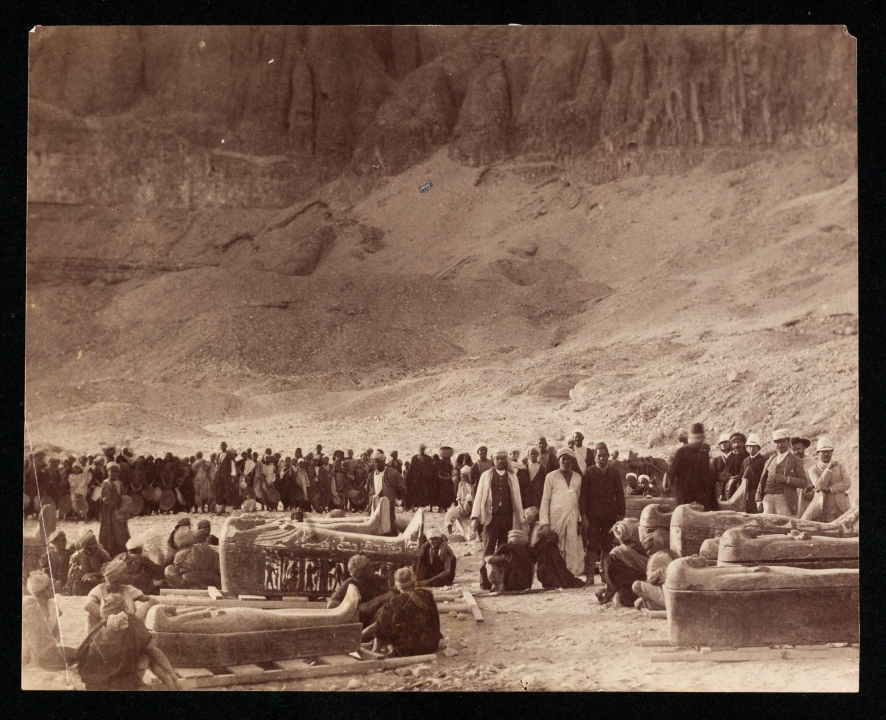
Photograph of the excavation, 5 Feb 1891

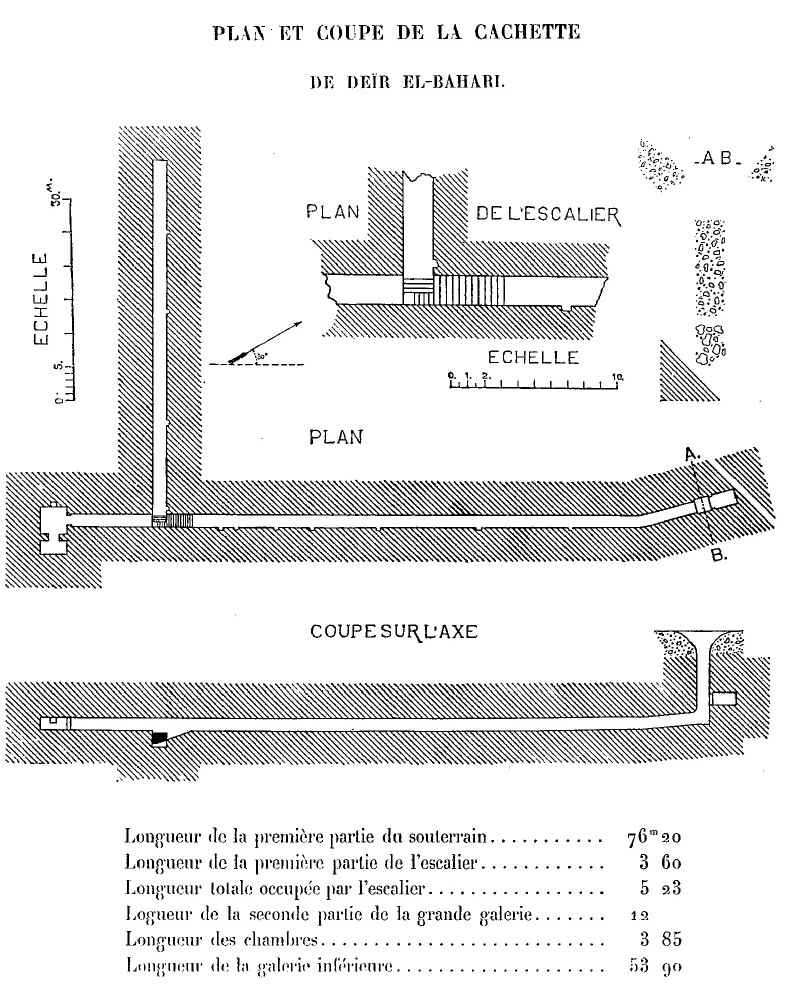
Diagram of Bab el-Gasus from Daressy's "Les sépultures des prêtres d’Ammon à Deir el-Bahari"

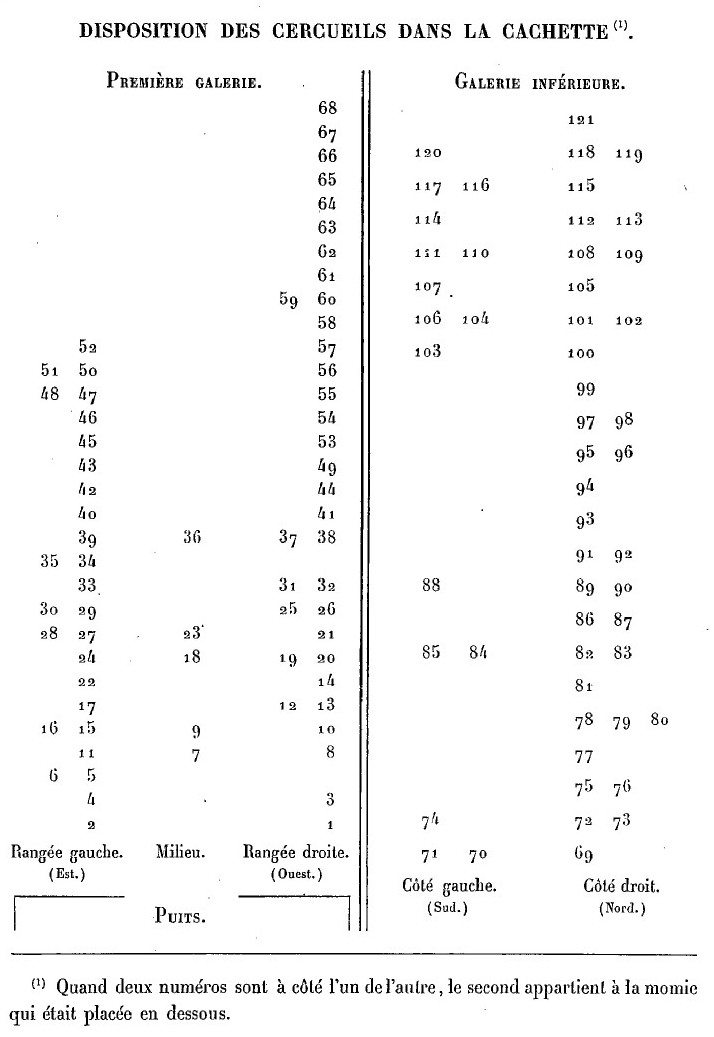
List of Bab el-Gasus sarcophagi from Daressy's "Les sépultures des prêtres d’Ammon à Deir el-Bahari"

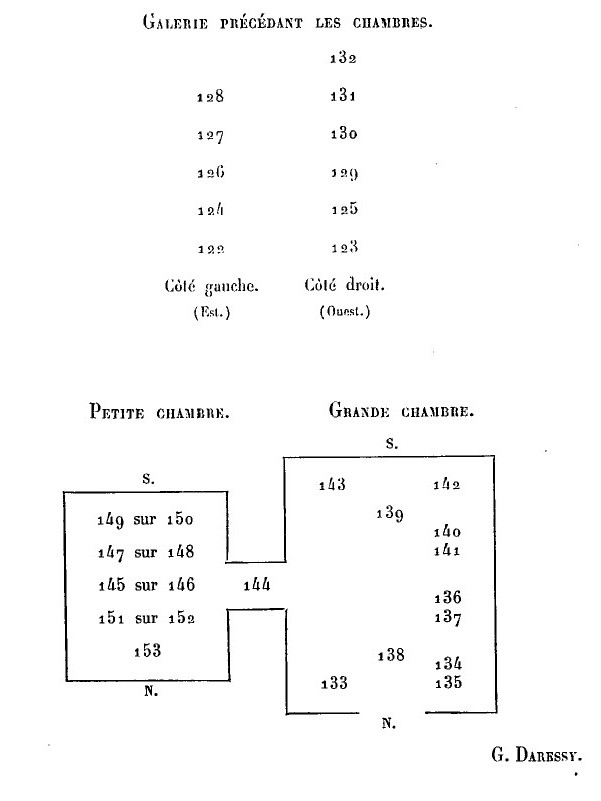
Second list of Bab el-Gasus sarcophagi of Bab el-Gasus from Daressy's "Les sépultures des prêtres d’Ammon à Deir el-Bahari"

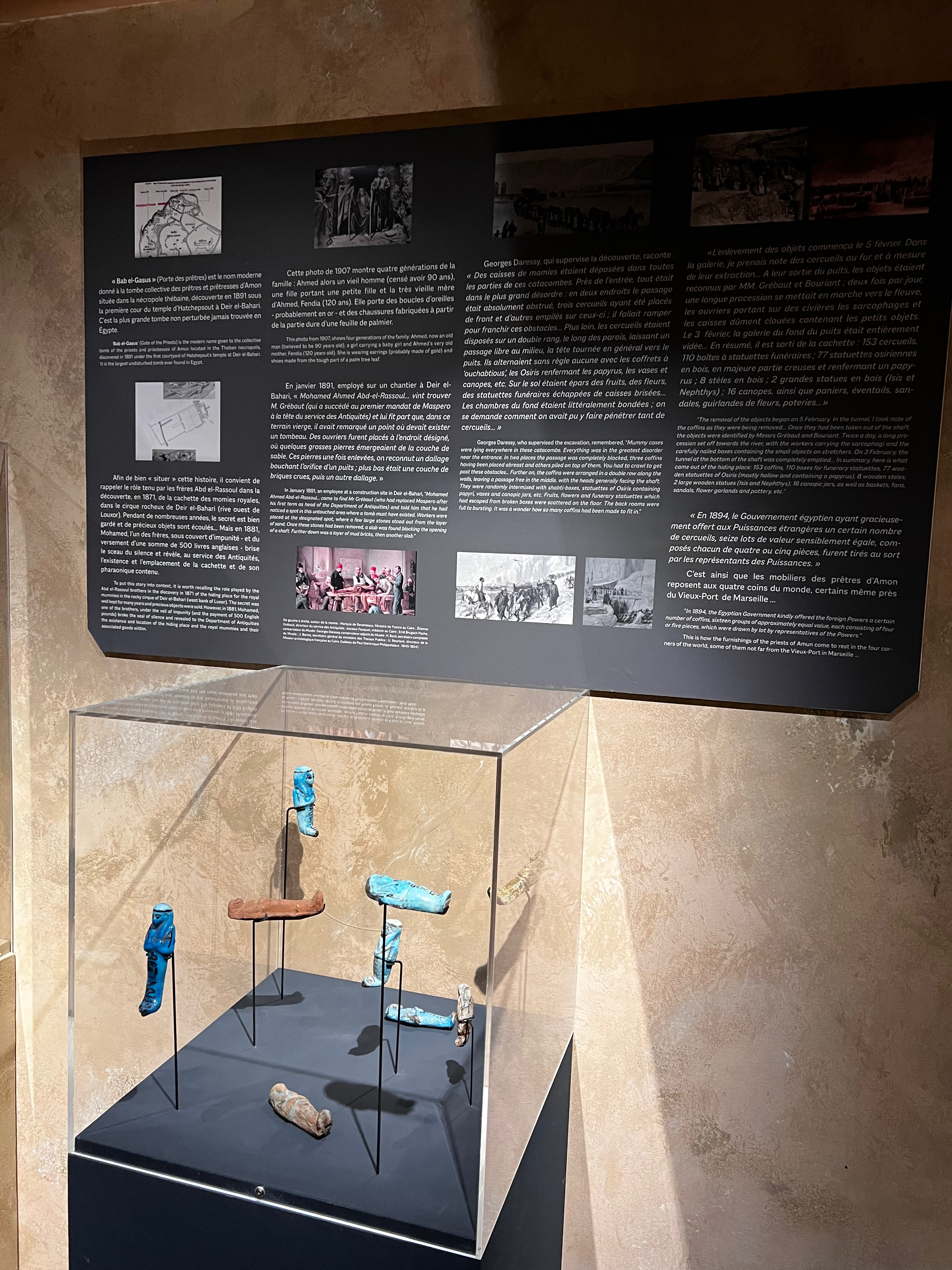
The story of Bab el-Gasus at Musée d'archéologie méditerranéenne, Marseille

=== Display at Egyptian Museum, Cairo ===
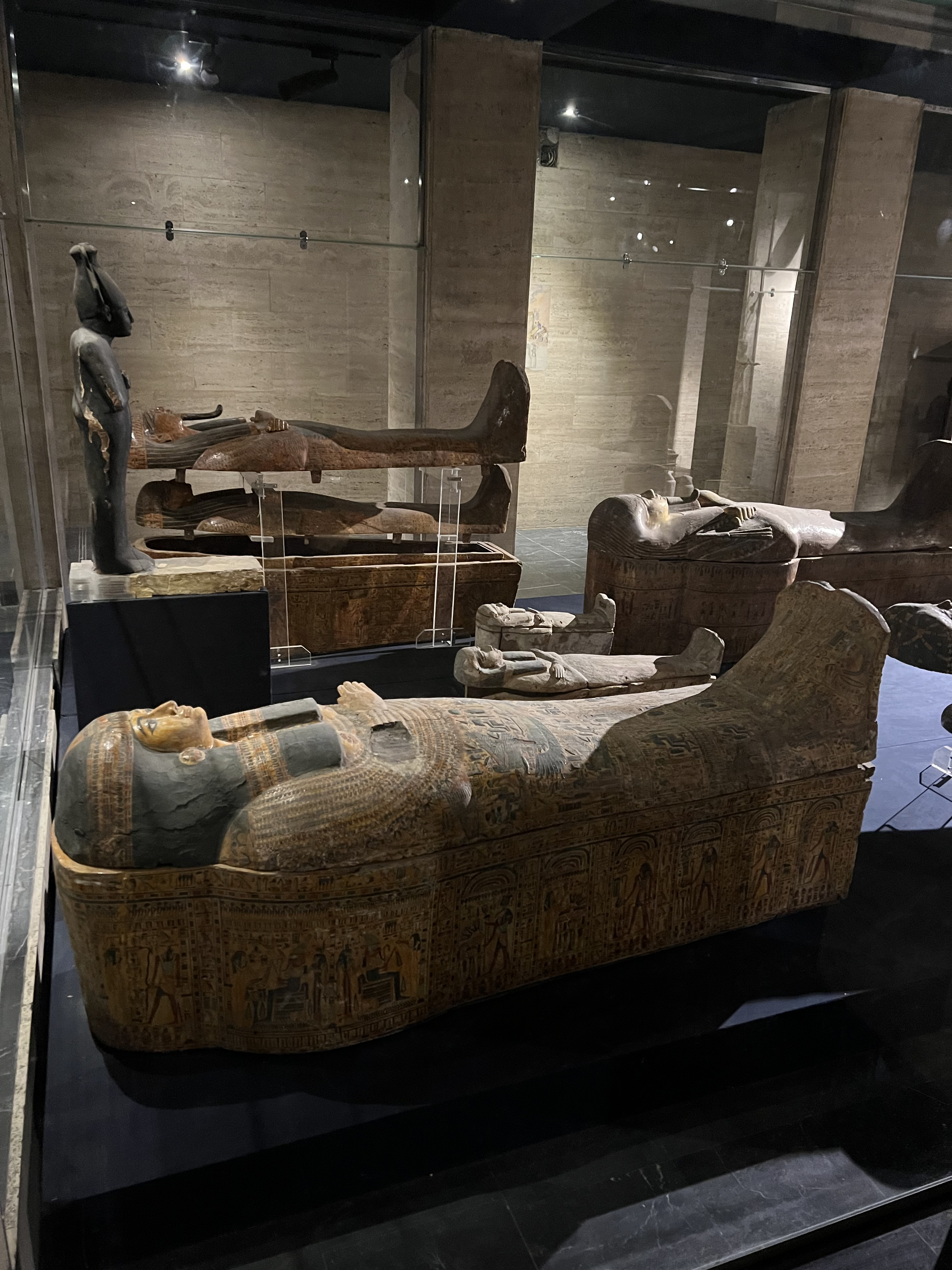

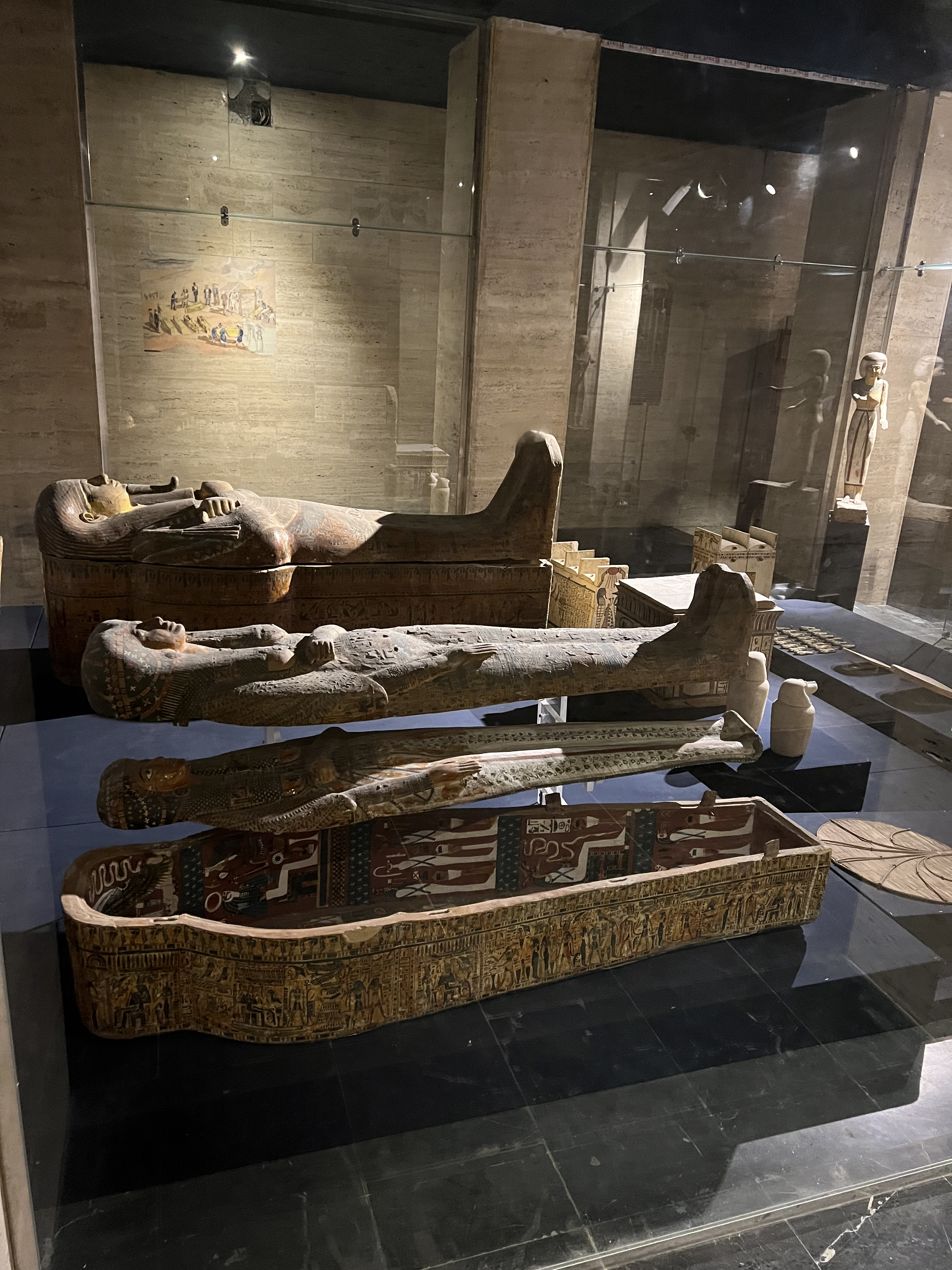

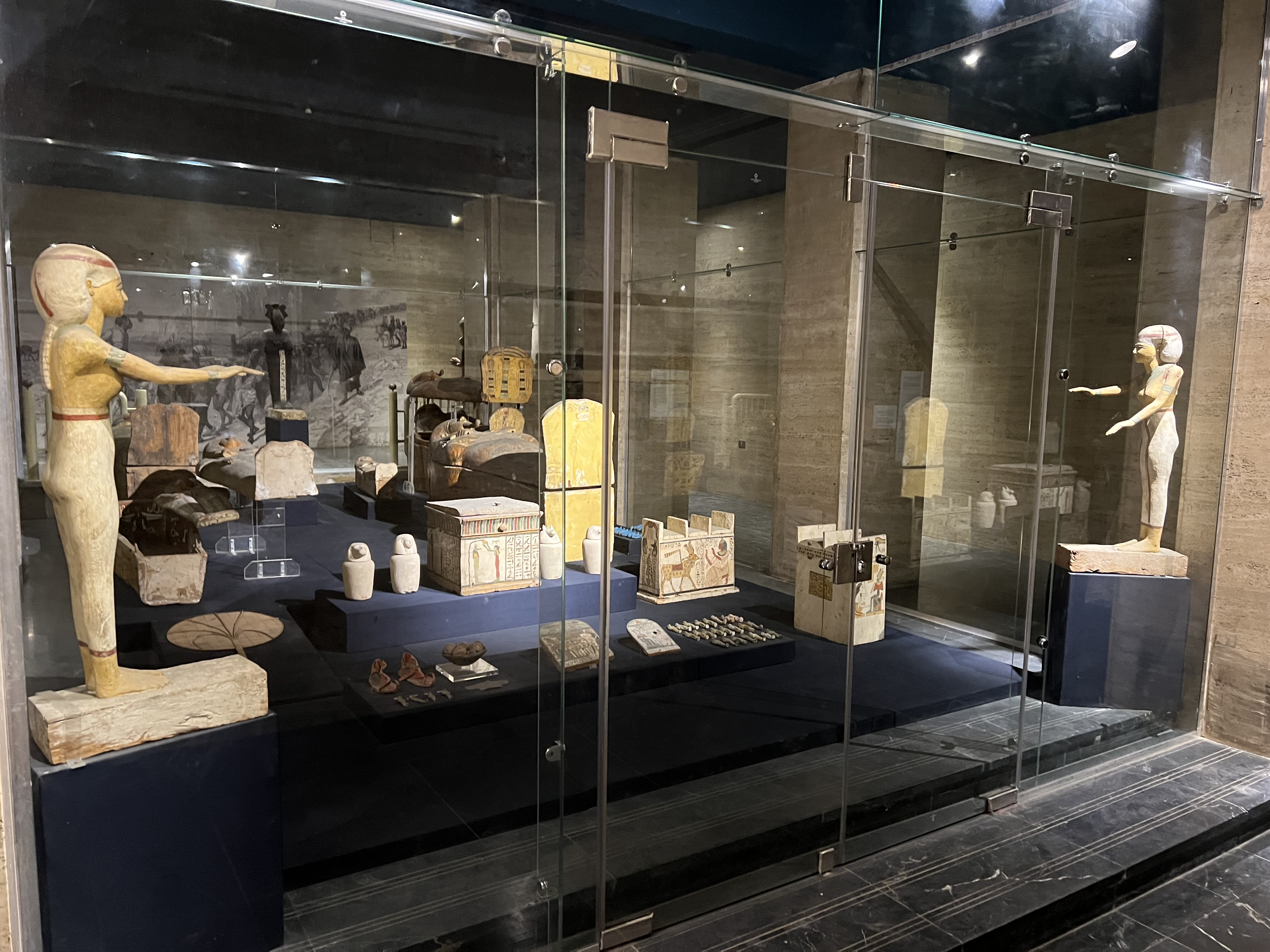

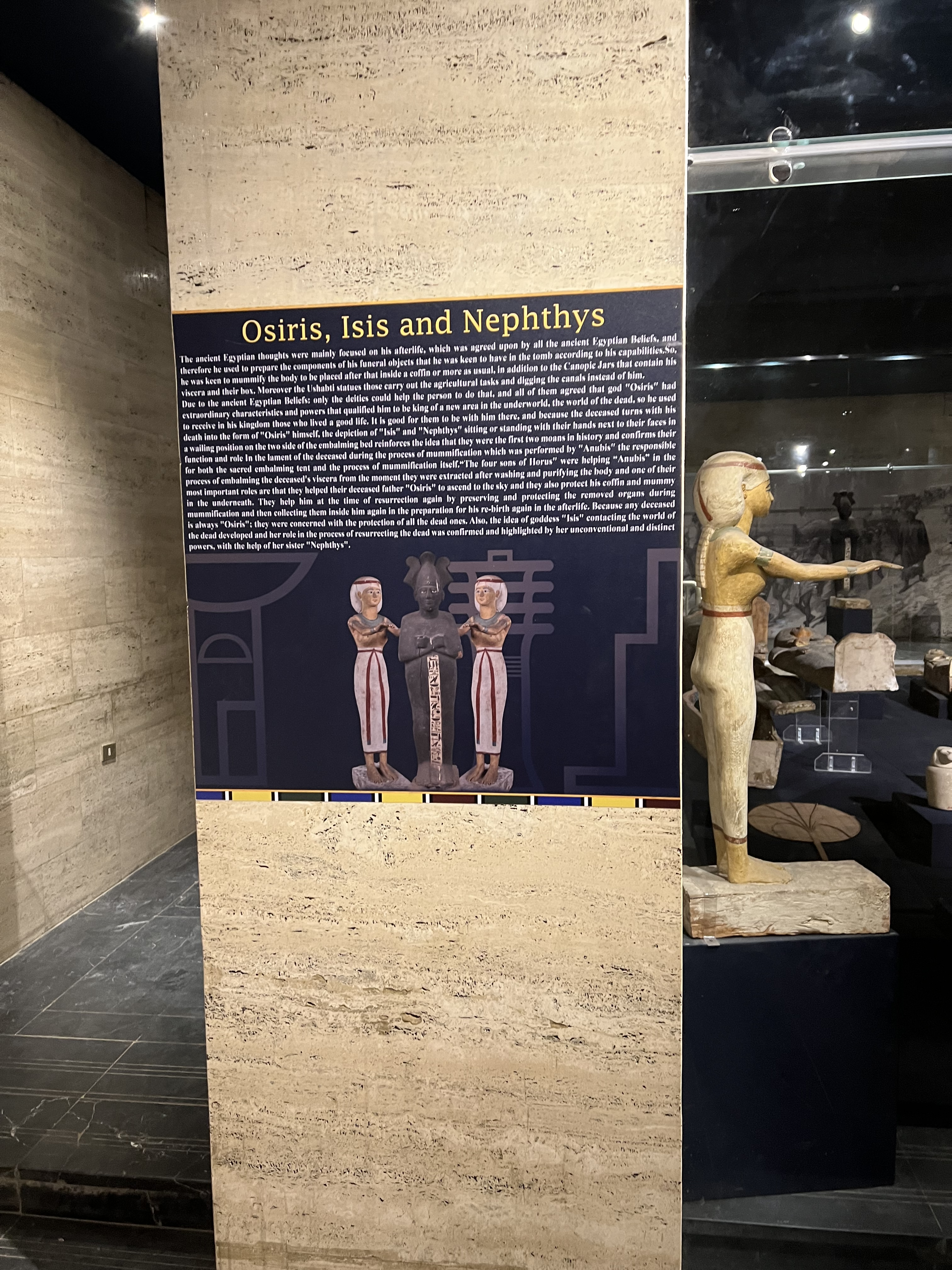

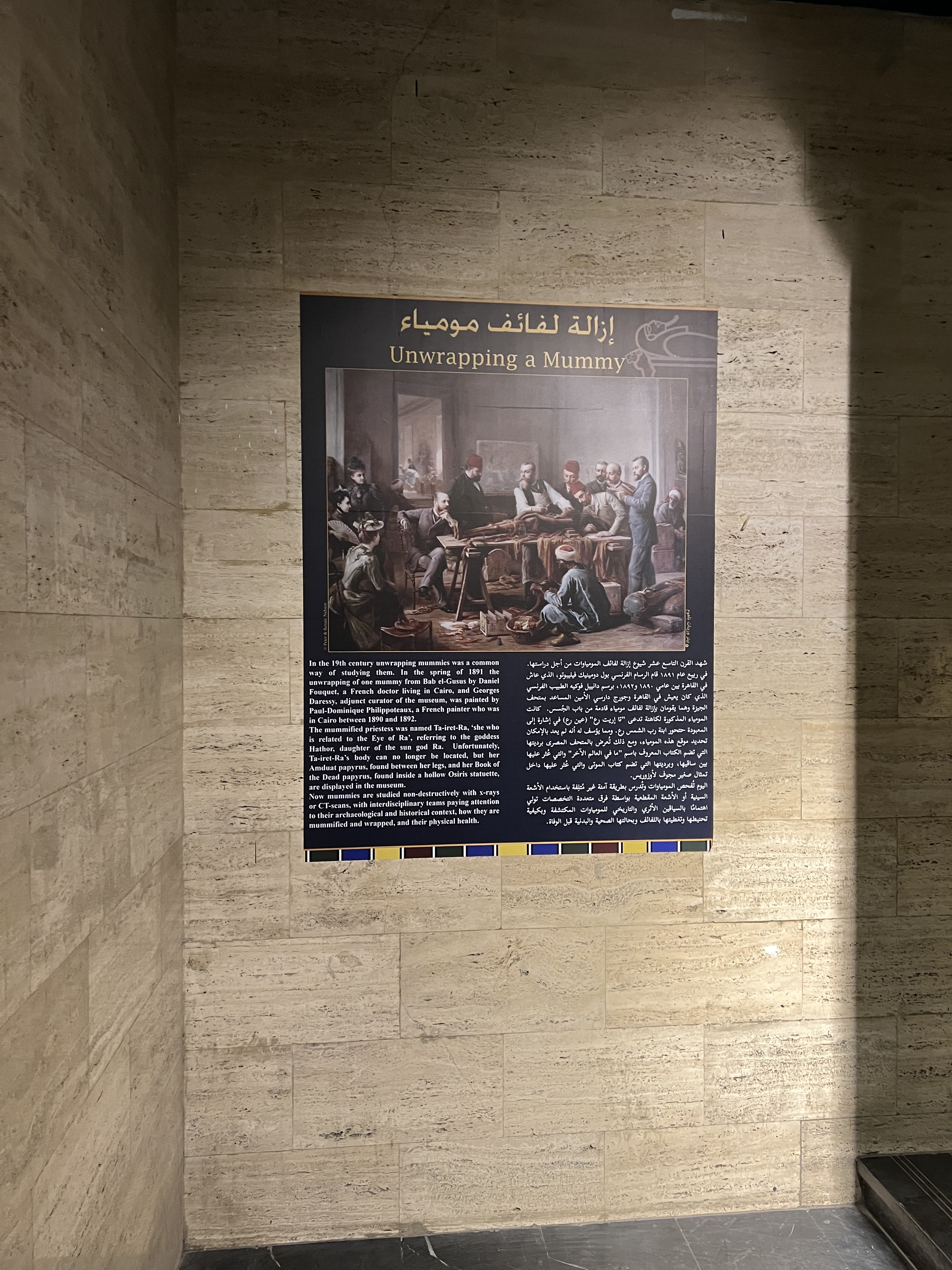

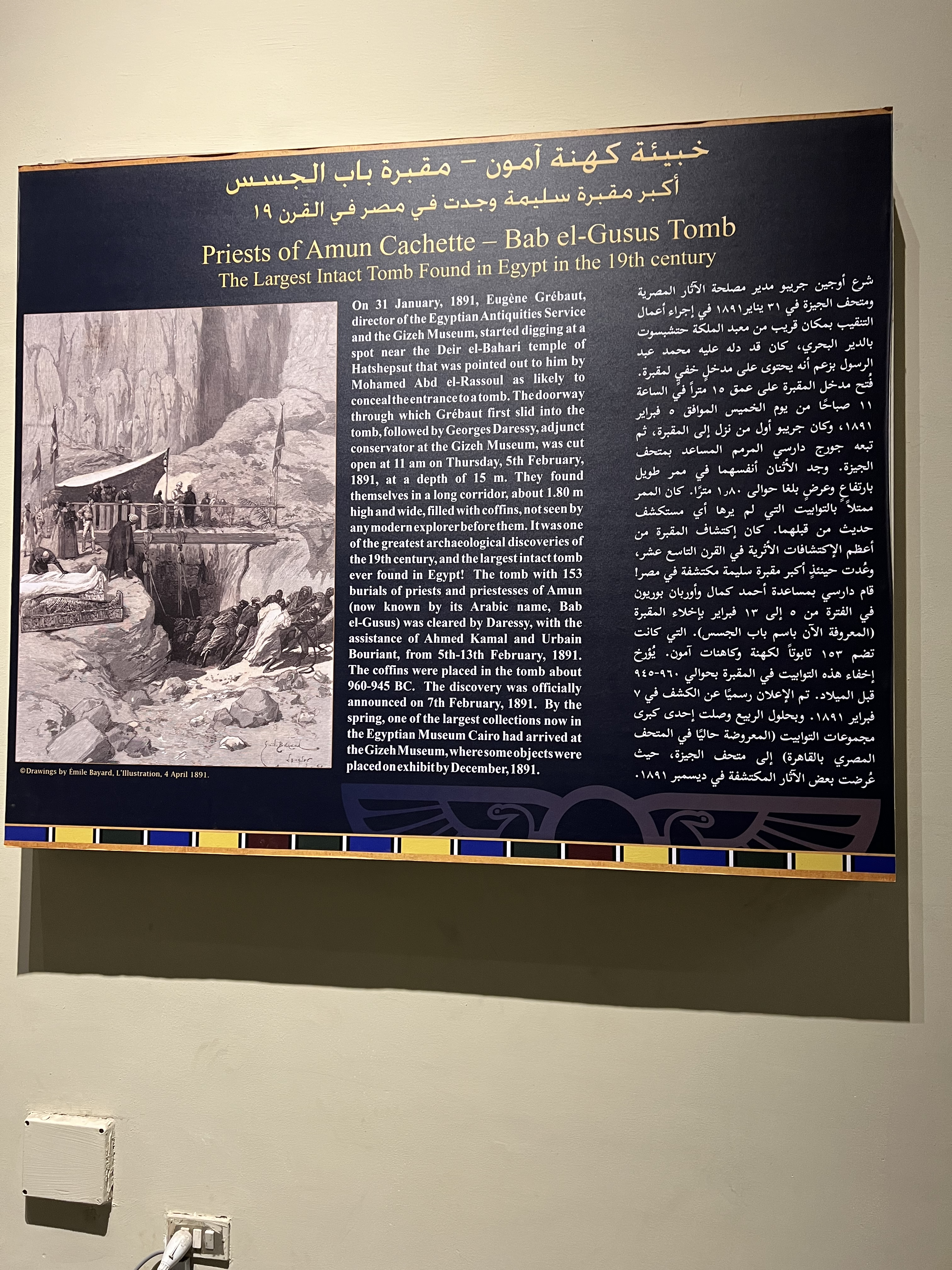
