= Gautseshen =

g A t V32 zSn
g.ꜣ.t.sšn
Gautseshen
in hieroglyphs
Era: 3rd Intermediate Period
(1069–664 BC)

Gautseshen (her name means 'bouquet of lotuses') was an ancient Egyptian priestess, the singer of Montu. She lived during the Twenty-first Dynasty of Egypt.

== Description ==
Her father was Menkheperre, High Priest of Amun; her mother was Princess Isetemkheb, a daughter of Pharaoh Psusennes I. Two of her brothers, Pinedjem II and Smendes II became High Priests of Amun. Gautseshen married Tjanefer, the Fourth, later Third Prophet of Amun. They had two sons, Pinedjem, later Fourth Prophet, and Menkheperre, Third Prophet of Amun.

She was buried at Bab el-Gasus, where most of her family members were buried. Her coffins and funerary papyrus are now in the Egyptian Museum in Cairo. The papyrus is a beautifully illustrated copy of the Book of the Dead, which shows the changes in funerary texts during the 21st dynasty, when the solar cult and that of Osiris gradually merged. One of the examples of this can be seen in three spells, which originally mentioned Ra (as it can be seen from 18th dynasty copies of the text), but here they mention Osiris. Another hymn, originally belonging to Osiris, was enriched with solar elements.
