= Banishment Stela =

C. 11th-century BCE Egyptian stela

Banishment Stela / Maunier Stela
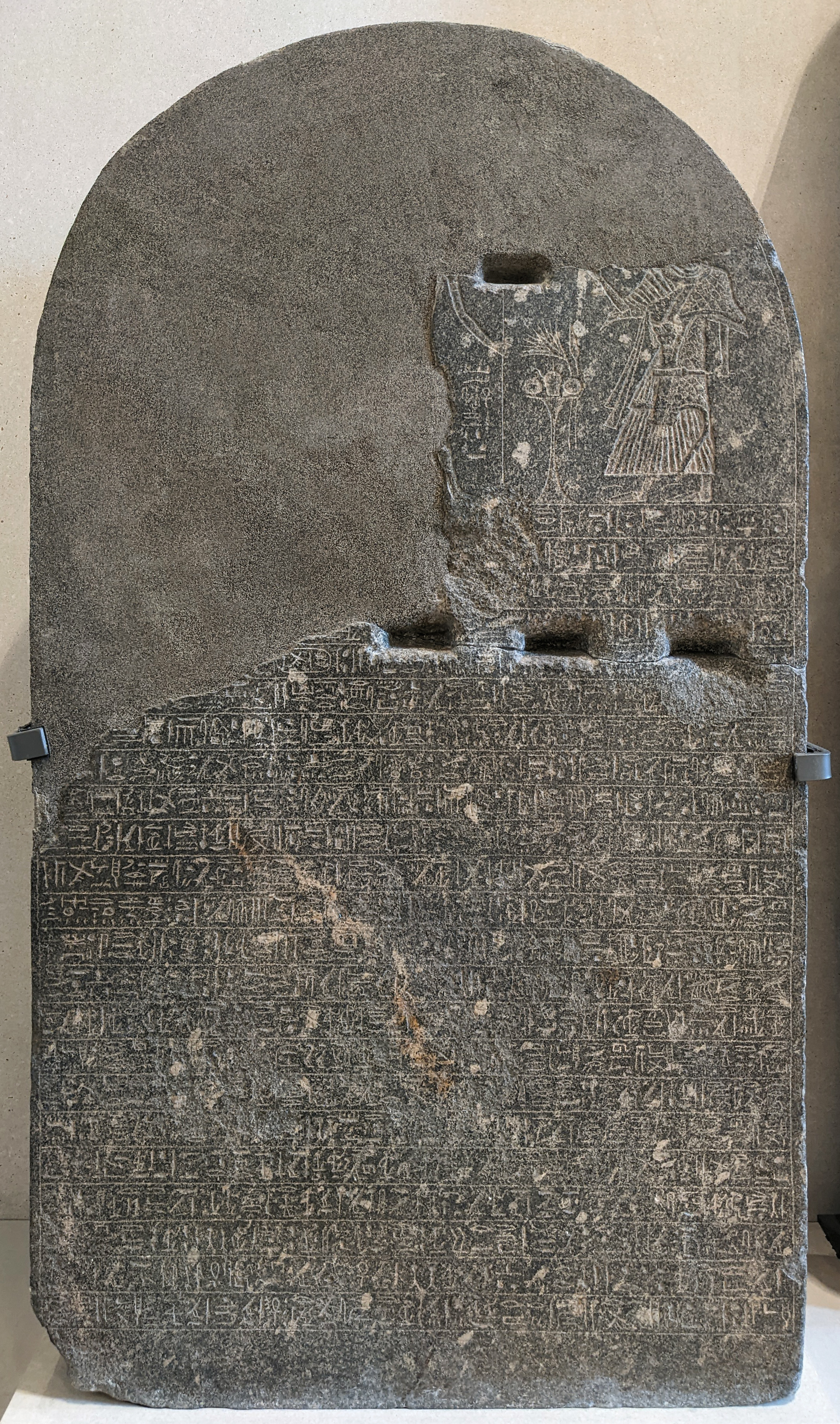
- Material: Diorite
- Size: 127 cm (50 in) x 82 cm (32 in)
- Writing: Egyptian hieroglyphs
- Created: c. 1050 BCE
- Discovered: c. 1860; Luxor
- Discovered by: Henri Maunier
- Present location: Louvre
- Identification: C 256

The Banishment Stela or Maunier Stela (Louvre C 256) is an ancient Egyptian stela issued in c.1050 BCE. It contains an amnesty decree of the 21st Dynasty High Priest of Amun Menkheperre.

== History ==
The Banishment Stela was discovered in Luxor around 1860 by the then French Vice-Consul, Henri Maunier; it was carried to Paris in 1884 and exhibited at the Louvre where it still is. The stela is made from diorite and measures 127 cm (50 in) in height and 82 cm (32 in) in width. The upper part is poorly preserved, and only a depiction of Menkheperre praying to the god Amun is still visible; the lower portion is in better condition and of the 23 lines of Egyptian hieroglyph text, only the first four are mostly lost.

== Content ==
The stela mentions three dates, although it is not entirely clear what happened on them, or even to which reign(s) they belonged. These dates are (in the order in which they appear in the text, which is not necessarily their correct chronological order):

- Date A: year 25, third month of the Season of the Harvest (= month 11), day 29
- Date B: year 25, first month of the Season of the Inundation (= month 1), day 4 or 5
- Date C: year ... , fourth month of the Season of the Harvest, epagomenal days, Birth of Isis

According to Von Beckerath, with date C, for reasons of space, the regnal year could only have been relatively low. Acceptable solutions would be: 1, 2, 3, 4, 5, 10, 11 or 20.

The stela apparently reports that in the regnal Year 25 of an unknown pharaoh a revolt sparked in Thebes against the Priesthood of Amun. The revolt was suffocated in the same year, and the rebels were banished (date A) into the Kharga Oasis by decision of the oracle of Amun. Shortly after (date B) Menkheperre was installed as generalissimo and High Priest of Amun “by the god Amun himself”; in the early reign of another king (date C), Menkheperre again resorted to the oracle and obtained the recall and pardon of the exiles, just before issuing the stela to celebrate this act.

The king whose regnal Year 25 is reported on the stela (date A) could only have been the founder of the 21st Dynasty Smendes, who is generally assumed to have reigned for around 25–26 years. The king who was in charge when the stela was issued (date C) was one of his immediate successors, most likely the ephemeral and poorly known Amenemnisu, or alternatively but less likely, Psusennes I.
