= Smendes II =

Theban High Priest of Amun

Nesbanebdjed II
- High Priest of Amun
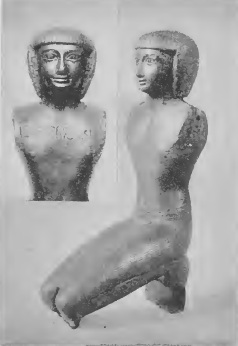
- Statuette depicting a High Priest of Amun Smendes, possibly Smendes II
- Tenure: 992–990 BC
- Predecessor: Menkheperre
- Successor: Pinedjem II
- Spouse: Henuttawy C, Takhentdjehuti
- Father: Menkheperre
- Mother: Isetemkheb III
- Children: Neskhons, Isetemkheb E

Smendes II was a High Priest of Amun at Thebes in Ancient Egypt. He briefly governed from around 992 to 990 BC.

== Biography ==
The name Smendes is a hellenization of the Egyptian name Nesbanebdjed ("He of the ram, lord of Mendes"), while the ordinal number distinguishes him from the founder of the 21st Dynasty Smendes I, and from the later, namesake High Priest of Amun, Smendes III.

Smendes was one of the sons of High Priest Menkheperre and Princess Isetemkheb, the daughter of Psusennes I. He married his sister Henuttawy C and had a daughter, Isetemkheb E; another wife, Takhentdjehuti bore him Neskhons, who would be the wife of his brother and successor Pinedjem II.

His pontificate was short and left few traces, missing, for instance from the annals of Egyptian historian Manetho. He is mentioned on an inscription in Karnak, on mummy bandages and on a few bracelets found on the mummy of Psusennes I. Two extra objects bear the name of a High Priest of Amun Smendes but it is not possible to determine if these refer to Smendes II or the later Smendes III: these are a scribe's palette now at the Metropolitan Museum of Art (47.123a–g), and a bronze kneeling statuette exhibited at the Musée royal de Mariemont (ref. B242).

He was succeeded by his brother Pinedjem II.
