= Tjanefer =

TA Z1 nfr
ṯꜣ.nfr
Tjanefer
in hieroglyphs
Era: New Kingdom
(1550–1069 BC)

Tjanefer (fl. c. 1008 BCE) was an ancient Egyptian priest during the reign of the Twenty-first Dynasty of Egypt.

== Description ==
His father was Nesipaherenmut, the Fourth Prophet of Amun, and his mother was Isetemheb. According to the Karnak Priestly Annals, Tjanefer served as the Fourth Prophet of Amun in the 40th regnal year of Psusennes I (c. 1008 BCE). He was later promoted to Third Prophet, as it is mentioned in a papyrus found in his tomb at Bab el-Gasus (which is now housed in the Egyptian Museum in Cairo).

He married Gautseshen, the daughter of High Priest Menkheperre and Princess Isetemkheb. They had two sons, Pinedjem, later Fourth Prophet, and Menkheperre, Third Prophet of Amun.
