= Neskhons =

Ancient Egyptian noble lady, wife of Pinedjem II

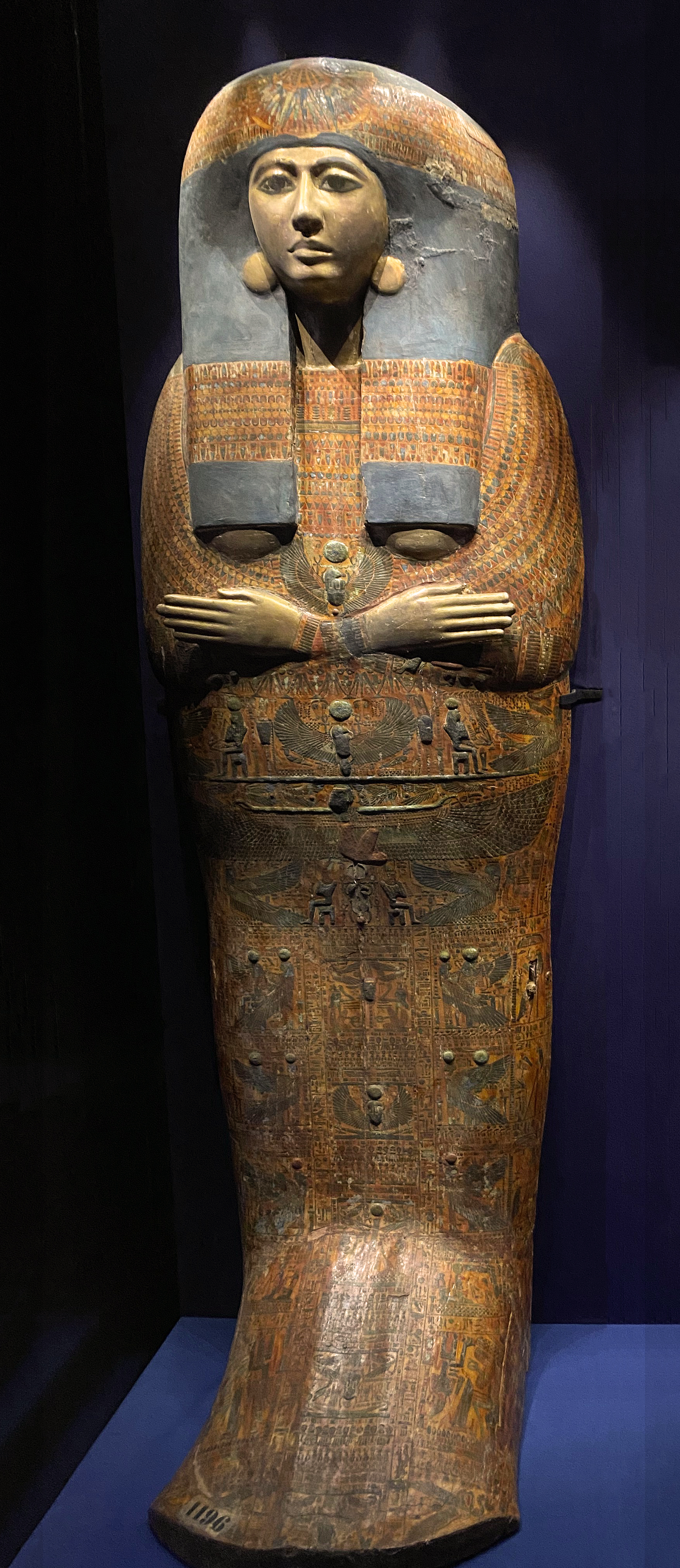
- The Gold Gilded Cedar Outer Coffin of Neshkhons
- Spouse: Pinedjem II
- Issue: Nesitanebetashru and 3 others
- Father: Smendes II

Neskhons (“She Belongs to Khons”), once more commonly known as Nsikhonsou, was a noble lady of the 21st Dynasty of Egypt.

== Biography ==
ns z x n sw
Neskhons
in hieroglyphs
Era: 3rd Intermediate Period
(1069–664 BC)

She was the daughter of Smendes II and Takhentdjehuti, and shed married her paternal uncle, High Priest Pinedjem II, by whom she had four children: two sons, Tjanefer and Masaharta, and two daughters, Itawy and Nesitanebetashru. These are named on a decree written on a wooden stela, which was placed in her tomb in order to ensure her well-being in the afterlife and to prevent her doing harm to her husband and children. This suggests family problems around the time of her death.

== Death ==
=== Burial ===
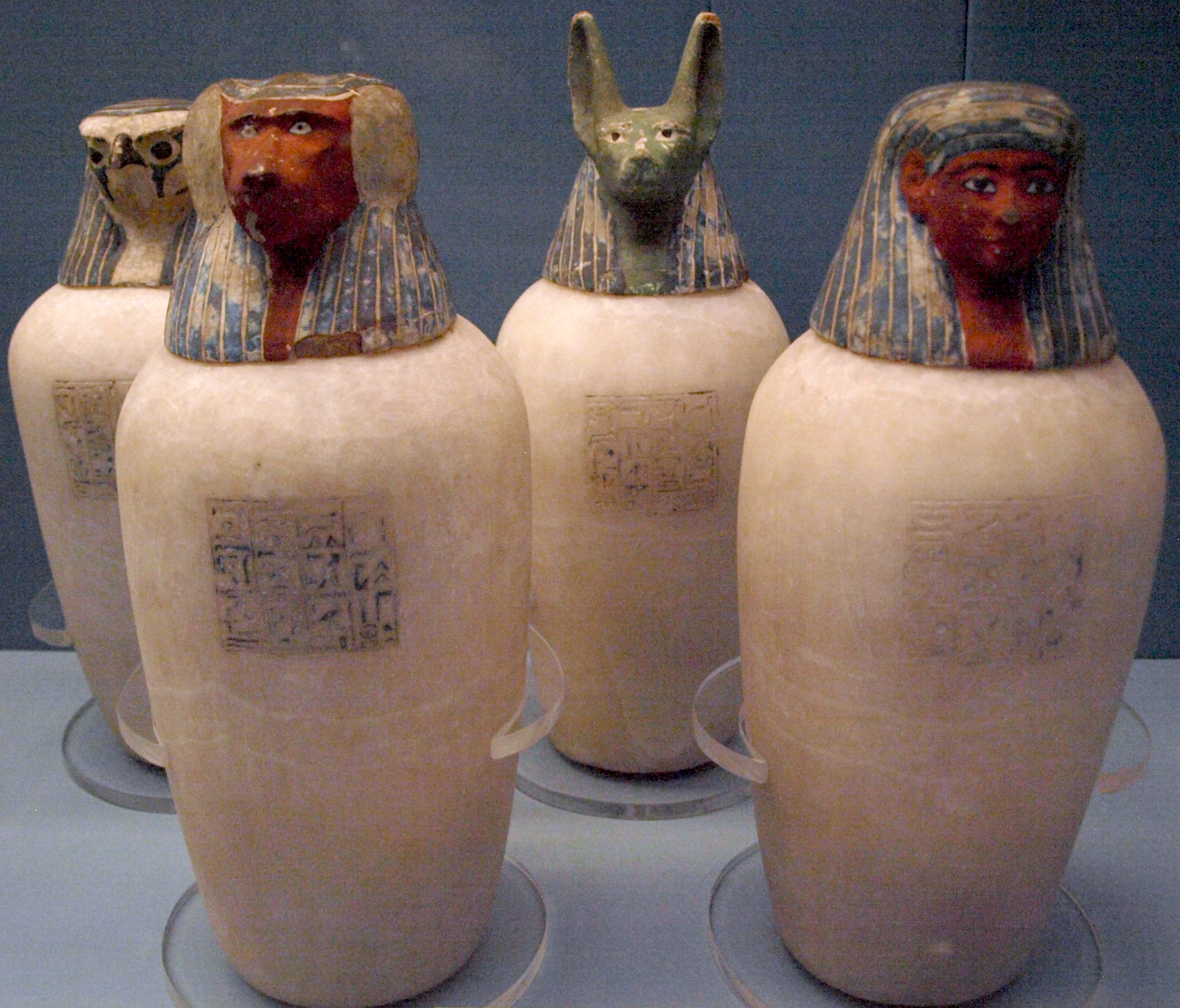
Canopic jars of Neskhons in the British Museum.

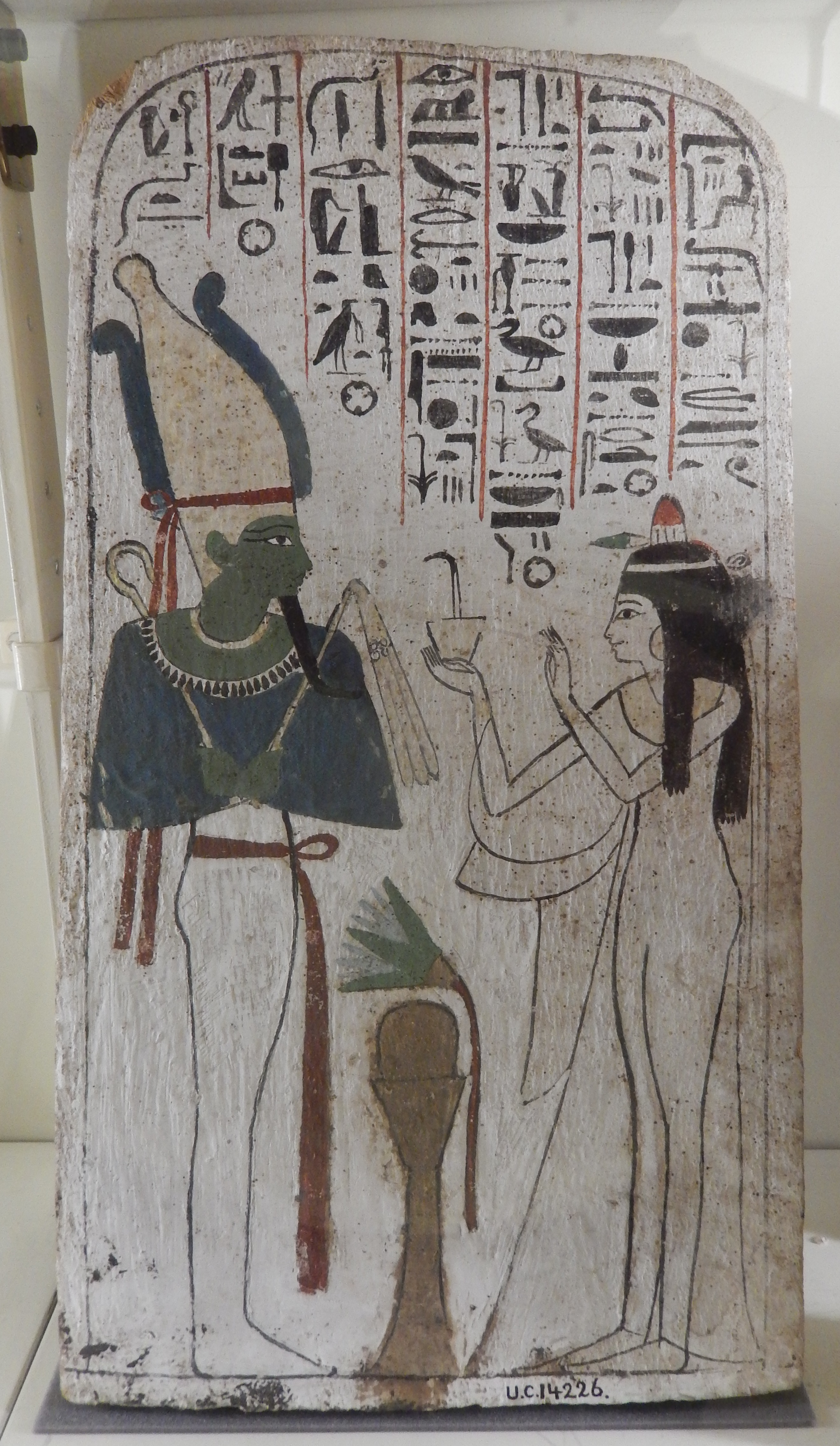
A Funerary stela depicting Neskhons with Osiris

She predeceased her husband and her mummified corpse was placed with that of Pinedjem II in Tomb DB320 in the Theban Necropolis, in which it was rediscovered in 1881. She was buried in the 5th regnal year of Siamun in coffins that were originally made for Pinedjem's sister and first wife Isetemkheb D. Both the inner and outer coffins were found, but one of them was reused for the reburial of Ramesses IX. It is unknown whether her coffin was reused after her death or that she donated it to the reburial of Ramesses. The later theory is supported by the fact that she also donated linens for the rewrapping of his mummy; the former is indicated by the fact that apparently no attempt has been made to redecorate the coffin for a male mummy.

=== Mummy ===
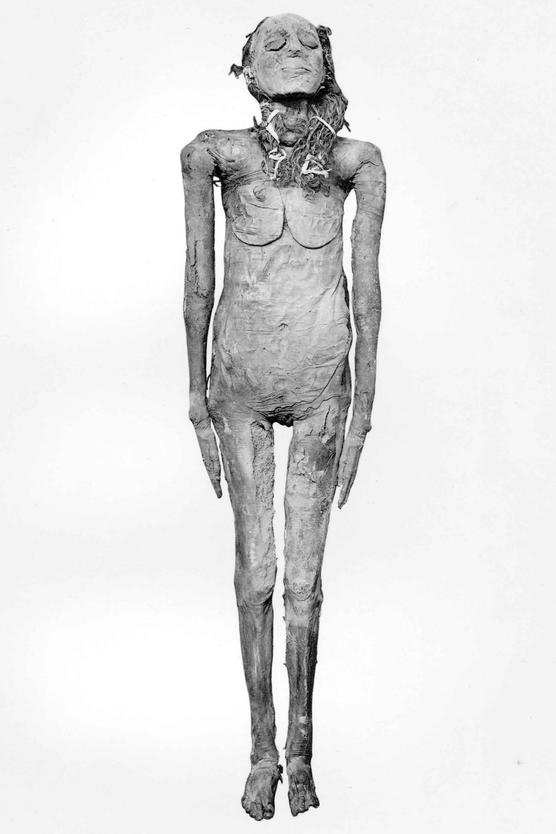
Mummy of Neskhons

The corpse was partially unwrapped by Gaston Maspero on 27 June 1886; twenty years later, G. Elliot Smith removed the remainder of the wrappings. Neskhons did not have any gray hairs, so it is likely that she died young; according to Smith, she was either pregnant or giving birth at her death. The gold decoration of her coffin has been stolen in antiquity; her heart scarab was stolen by the Abd-el-Rassul family of grave robbers, but has been recovered and taken to the British Museum.

Her titles were: First Chantress of Amun; King's Son of Kush.
