= Amenemnisu =

Egyptian pharaoh

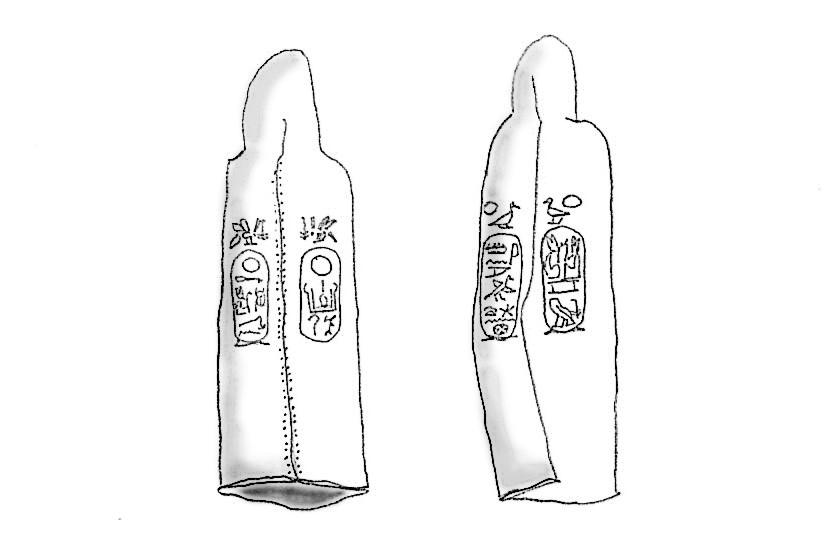
- Drawing of the bowcaps containing both Amenemnisu and Psusennes' names

Pharaoh
- Reign: 4 regnal years 1051–1047 BC
- Predecessor: Smendes
- Successor: Psusennes I
Royal titulary
Prenomen
Neferkare Heqawaset
Nfr-Kȝ-Rˁ Ḥqȝ Wȝs.t
Perfect is the Ka of Ra, ruler of Thebes
M23 t L2 t < N5 nfr D28 S38 R19 >
Nomen
Amenemnisu
Jmn-m-nswt
Amun is king

G39 N5	i mn n m M23
- Children: No issue known
- Father: Smendes (?)
- Mother: Tendamun B(?)
- Died: 1047 BC
- Dynasty: 21st Dynasty

Neferkare Amenemnisu was an ancient Egyptian pharaoh, the second king of the 21st Dynasty.

== Family ==
=== Parentage and Siblings ===
Amenemnisu may have been the son of Smendes and born to Tentamun B, the daughter of Ramesses XI. Thus, he was the maternal grandson of Ramesses XI, the last ruler of the 20th Dynasty.

=== Marriages and Children ===
No wives or children are known.

== Reign ==
Amenemnisu succeeded Smendes on the throne.

Reign of Amenemnisu
Reg Yr	Event
00	Accession Year of Amenemnisu
01	Amenemnisu celebrates the start of his reign on 1 Akhet Day 1 (New Year).
02	-
03	-
04	Amenemnisu dies. Accession Year of Psusennes I.

=== Lower Egypt ===
Amenemnisu's existence was only confirmed in 1940 when the Tanite tomb of his successor Psusennes I was discovered by Pierre Montet: a gold bow cap inscribed with both Amenemnisu's royal name, Neferkare, and that of his successor Psusennes I was found within the tomb. Previously, his existence had been doubted as no objects naming him had been discovered. However, the memory of his short rule as the second pharaoh of the 21st Dynasty was preserved in Manetho's Epitome as a king Nephercheres who is assigned a short reign of four years.

=== Upper Egypt ===
==== Pardon of rebellions ====
While his reign is generally obscure, the then High Priest of Amun at Thebes, Menkheperre, is known to have pardoned several leaders of a rebellion against the High Priest's authority during Amenemnisu's reign. These rebels had previously been exiled to the Western Oasis of Egypt in Year 25 of Smendes. These events are reported on the so-called Banishment Stela (Louvre C. 256), likely made during the brief reign of Amenemnisu.

=== Reign Length ===
Amenemnisu is thought to have ruled about 4 regnal years.

Manetho assigns him a reign of four years under the name Nephercheres, the Greek rendering of Amenemnisu's throne name, Neferkare. Manetho's Aegyptiaca only exists in fragments and summaries by later writers, Africanus (Syncellus) lists Nephercherês (the third king in his sequence) as reigning for 4 years, Eusebius (Syncellus) lists Nephercherês with a reign of 4 years, Armenian Version of Eusebius records Nephercheres as ruling for 4 years. However, there are discrepancies in Manetho's record regarding the chronology, Nephercheres being placed after Psusennes I.

A gold bow cap found by Pierre Montet, confirms he was actually the second king and Psusennes' predecessor. Before the 1940 discovery of that bow cap, Amenemnisu was known only through Manetho’s lists, leading some early historians to doubt his existence.

=== Succession ===
Amenemnisu was not succeeded by any of his children, but by his cousin Psusennes I - another maternal grandson of Ramesses XI.

== Burial ==
At Tanis, Amenemnisu was buried along with his successor Psusennes I (NRT III). No tomb with the name of Amenemnisu have been found.

== See also ==
- List of pharaohs
