= 1020s BC =

Decade

The 1020s BC is a decade that lasted from 1029 BC to 1020 BC.

== Events and trends ==
- 1027 BC — Traditional date for the end of the Shang dynasty in China, and the beginning of the Zhou dynasty.
- 1026 BC — Saul becomes the first king of the Israelites.
- c. 1025 BC — End of Mycenaean dominance.
- c. 1020 BC — destruction of Troy.

== Births ==
- 1027 BC — Zhao of Zhou
