= Menkheperre =

Ancient Egyptian high priest

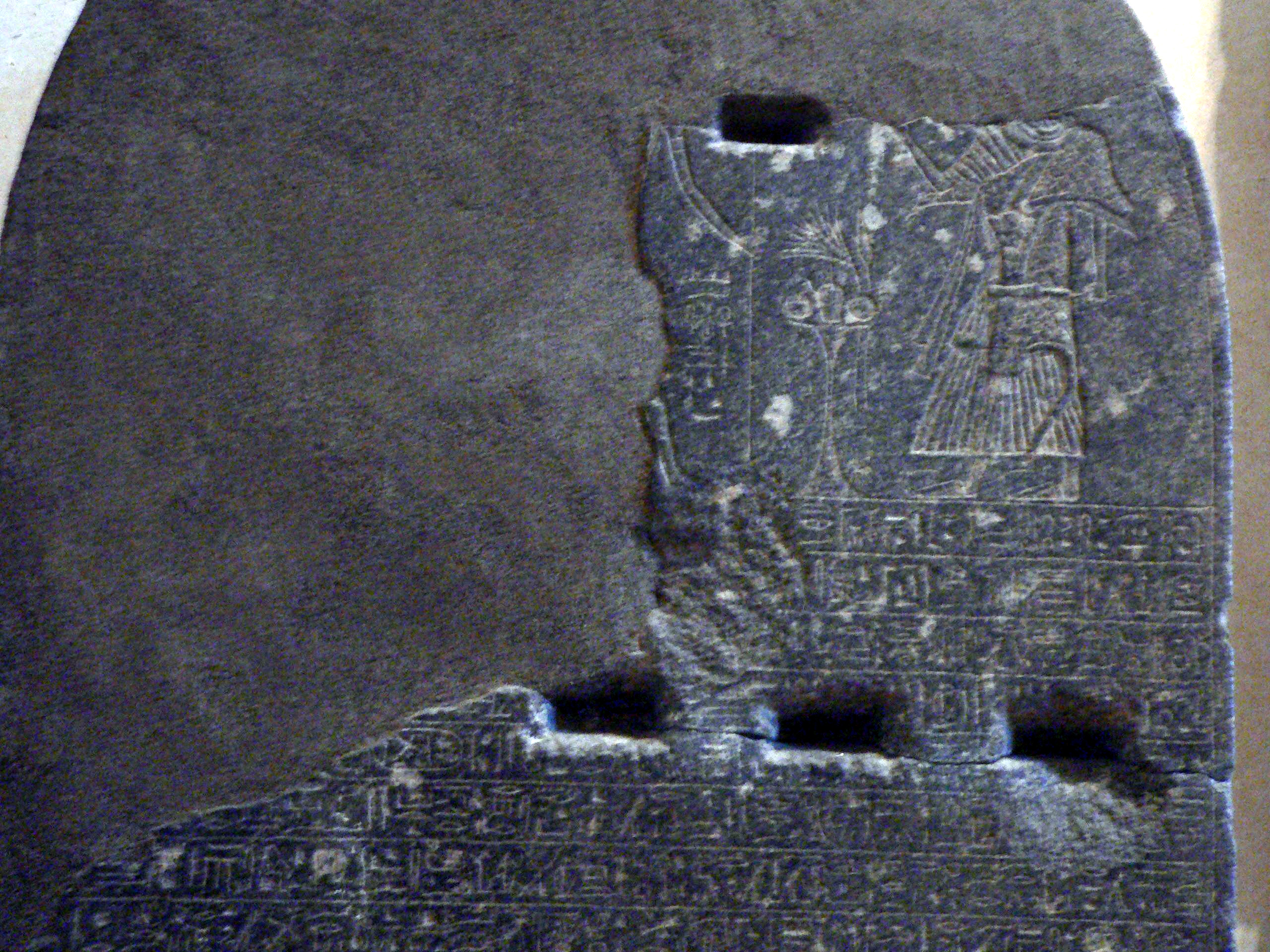
- Menkheperre (right) on the Banishment Stela at the Louvre.

High Priest of Amun and Pharaoh
- Reign: 1045–992 BC
- Predecessor: Djedkhonsuefankh
- Successor: Smendes II
Royal titulary
Prenomen
Hem-netjer-tepi-en-Amun
Ḥm-nṯr-tpj-n-Jmn
High Priest of Amun

M23 X1 L2 X1	R8 U36 D1 n Z1 i mn n
Nomen
Menkheperre
Mn ḫpr Rˁ
Enduring is the apparition of Ra
< N5 mn L1 >
- Consort: Isetemkheb C
- Children: Smendes II, Henuttawy C, Pinedjem II, Isetemkheb D, Hori, Meritamen, Gautseshen
- Father: Pinedjem I
- Mother: Duathathor-Henuttawy

Menkheperre, son of Pinedjem I by wife Duathathor-Henuttawy (daughter of Ramesses XI by wife Tentamon), was the High Priests of Amun at Thebes in ancient Egypt from 1045 BC to 992 BC and ruler of the south of the country.

== Biography ==
Menkheperre's eldest full brother Masaharta followed their father Pinedjem I as High Priest. He was followed by another brother, Djedkhonsuefankh, after whose death, in the 25th year of Smendes I, Menkheperre became High Priest. With his elder half-brother ruling at Tanis as Pharaoh Psusennes I, Menkheperre's power, like that of Masaharta, must have been somewhat curtailed. Menkheperre took as his throne name the title of "First prophet of Amun", just as his great-grandfather Herihor had, perhaps an indication of this diminished role, though he kept the cartouche unlike his successors in the temple.

Menkheperre married his niece Isetemkheb, daughter of his brother Psusennes I and wife Wiay. Their children were:

- Smendes II, also called Nesbanebdjed II, who followed him as High Priest.
- Henuttawy C, wife of Smendes II, Chantress of Amun. She is mentioned on the 10th pylon of the Karnak temple. She was buried in the Deir el-Bahari tomb MMA60, her coffins are now in Boston and New York. She had a daughter called Isetemkheb.
- Pinedjem II, High Priest after his brother's death. He married his sister Isetemkheb and became the father of Pharaoh Psusennes II.
- Isetemkheb D, wife of Pinedjem II.
- Hori, priest of Amun and Seth. His mummy and coffins were found at Bab el-Gasus (Deir el-Bahari) and are now in Cairo.
- Meritamen, Chantress of Amun. She was buried at Bab el-Gasus under the pontificate of Psusennes II. Her coffins are in Cairo.
- Gautseshen, Chantress of Montu. She was buried at Bab el-Gasus, her coffins and papyrus are now in Cairo. She was married to Tjanefer, Third Prophet of Amun. Their sons, Pinedjem and Menkheperre became Third and Fourth Prophet of Amun, respectively.
- Psusennes, priest of Min, Horus and Isis at Coptos, known from a stela at the British Museum.

== See also ==
- Banishment Stela, a stela issued by Menkheperre during his early pontificate and containing an amnesty decree for some rebels.
