= Smendes =

Egyptian pharaoh

- Nesbanebdjed, Nesibanebdjedet
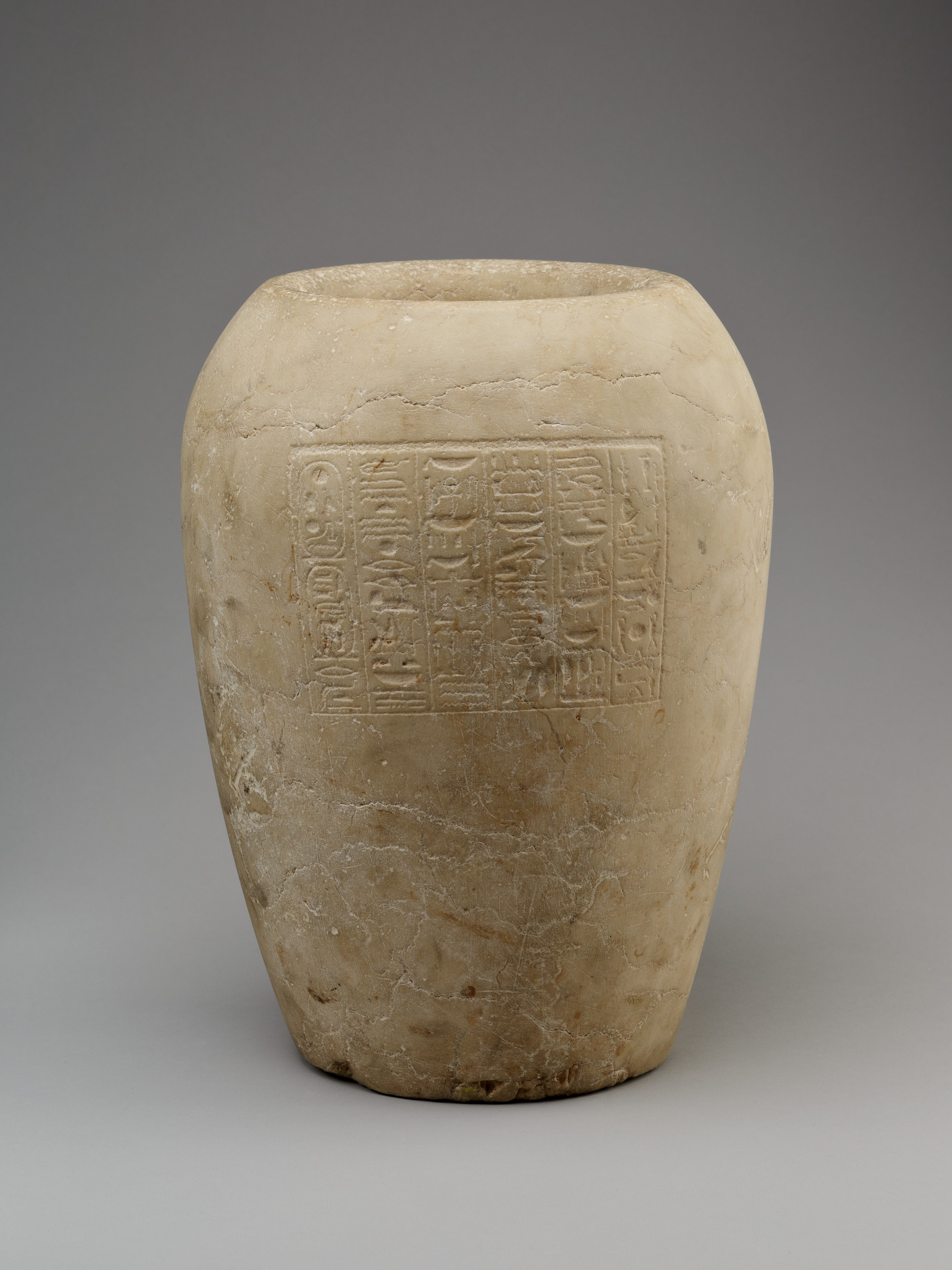
- Canopic jar of Smendes, Metropolitan Museum of Art.

Pharaoh
- Reign: 26 regnal years (Manetho) c. 1077/1076–1052 BC
- Predecessor: Ramesses XI
- Successor: Amenemnisu
Royal titulary
Horus name
Kanakht Meryre Suseramunkhepesheferseqaimaat
K3-nḫt-mrj-Rˁ-swsr-Jmn-ḫpš=f-r-sq3j-m3ˁt
Strong bull, beloved of Ra, Amun empowers
his strike to reinforce the Maat
G5	E2 D40 N5 Z1 mr s wsr s r D40 i mn n F23 f r s X7 A28 U5 D36 t H8
Nebty name
Sekhempehti Hureqiufbehatuf Hepetem[...]
Sḫm-pḥtj-ḥwj-rqw=f-bh3.tw=f-ḥtp-m (...)
Mighty of power, he who beats his opponents,
they flee before him, [he] encircles ...
G16	S42 F9 F9 V28 A24 r X7 i i A14 Z2 f D58 O4 G1 D54 t G43 f V28 p t D32 m HASH
Golden Horus
[...]khesefdenden
(...) Ḫsf-dndn
[...] wards off the wrath
G8	HASH U35 d n d n F7 D40
Prenomen
Hedjkheperre Setepenre
Ḥḏ-ḫpr-Rˁ-stp.n-Rˁ
Radiant manifestation of Ra, the chosen one of Ra
M23 t L2 t < N5 S1 L1 N5 U21 n >
Nomen
Nesbanebdjed Meriamun
Mrj-Jmn nsw-b3-nb-ḏdt
He of the Ba ram, lord of Mendes, beloved of Amun

G39 N5	i mn n U7 F20 z E10 nb R11 R11 t O49
- Consort: Tentamun B
- Children: Amenemnisu ?
- Mother: probably Hrere
- Died: 1052 BC
- Burial: Unknown
- Dynasty: 21st Dynasty

Hedjkheperre Setepenre Smendes was the founder of the Twenty-first Dynasty of Egypt and succeeded to the throne after burying Ramesses XI in Lower Egypt – territory which he controlled.

According to the Story of Wenamun from c. 1000 BC, Smendes was a governor of Lower Egypt during the Era of the Renaissance under the reign of Ramesses XI, however, Egyptologists have questioned the historical accuracy of this story.

== Family ==
=== Parentage and siblings ===
Smendes may have been a son of a lady named Hrere. Hrere was a Chief of the Harem of Amun-Re and likely the wife of a high priest of Amun. If Hrere was Smendes' mother, then he was a brother of Nodjmet and through her brother-in-law of the High Priests Herihor and Piankh.

=== Marriages and children ===
Smendes was married to Tentamun B, likely a daughter of Ramesses IX. They may have been the parents of his successor Amenemnisu.

== Name ==
His Egyptian nomen or birth name was actually Nesbanebdjed meaning "He of the Ram, Lord of Mendes", but it was translated into Greek as Smendes by later classical writers such as Josephus and Sextus Africanus.

His prenomen or throne name Hedjkheperre Setepenre/Setepenamun—which means 'Bright is the Manifestation of Rê, Chosen of Rê/Amun'—became very popular in the following 22nd Dynasty and 23rd Dynasty. In all, five kings: Shoshenq I, Shoshenq IV, Takelot I, Takelot II and Harsiese A adopted it for their own use.

== Early career ==
=== Report of Wenamun ===
Smendes features prominently in the Report of Wenamun. This story is set in an anonymous "Year 5", generally taken to be year 5 of the so-called Renaissance of Pharaoh Ramesses XI, the tenth and last ruler of the Twentieth Dynasty of Ancient Egypt (1190–1077 BC). However, since Karl Jansen-Winkeln has proposed to reverse the order of the High Priests of Amun Herihor and Piankh, this ascription has become disputed. With the pontificate of Herihor falling later than that of Piankh, who is attested in year 7 of the Renaissance, the date in the heading of Wenamun should rather refer to the successor of Ramesses XI. Following Jansen-Winkeln, Arno Egberts (1991) therefore argues that the story is set in the fifth regnal year of Smendes.

As the story begins, the principal character, Wenamun, a priest of Amun at Karnak, is sent by the High Priest of Amun Herihor to the Phoenician city of Byblos to acquire lumber (probably cedar wood) to build a new ship to transport the cult image of Amun. Wenamun first visits Smendes at Tanis and personally presented his letters of accreditation to Smendes in order to receive the latter's permission to travel north to modern Lebanon. Smendes responds by dispatching a ship for Wenamun's travels to Syria and the Levant. Smendes appears as a person of the highest importance in Tanis.

== Reign ==
Smendes succeeded Ramesses XI, the last ruler of the 20th Dynasty. Smendes was the son-in-law of Ramesses XI by marriage to Tentamun, and became the founder of the 21st Dynasty.

=== Lower Egypt ===
Smendes may have resided in Tanis (Report of Wenamun) or Memphis (quarry stela).

==== Administrative center of Zaon (Tanis) ====
At Zaon (Greek: Tanis; Modern: San el-Hagar), there are blocks, statues, and reused architectural elements bearing his prenomen and nomen. He reused monuments from earlier kings (especially Ramesside rulers), a common and well-documented practice. Tanis became capital under Psusennes I, who is credited with moving the city of Pi-Ramesses to Tanis - a process that may have started already with Smendes when Zaon was his administrative center.

=== Upper Egypt ===
Smendes' nominal authority over Upper Egypt is attested by a single inscribed stela found in a quarry at Ed-Dibabiya, opposite Gebelein on the right bank of the Nile, as well as by a separate graffito inscription on an enclosure Wall of the Temple of Monthu at Karnak, the Temple that was originally constructed during the reign of Thutmose III. The quarry stela describes how Smendes "while residing in Memphis, heard of danger to the temple of Luxor from flooding, gave orders for repairs (hence the quarry works), and received news of the success of the mission."

Smendes ruled over a divided Egypt and only effectively controlled Lower Egypt during his reign while Middle and Upper Egypt was effectively under the suzerainty of the High Priests of Amun such as Pinedjem I, Masaharta, and Menkheperre.

=== Reign length ===
Smendes is assigned a reign of 26 Years by Manetho in his Epitome.

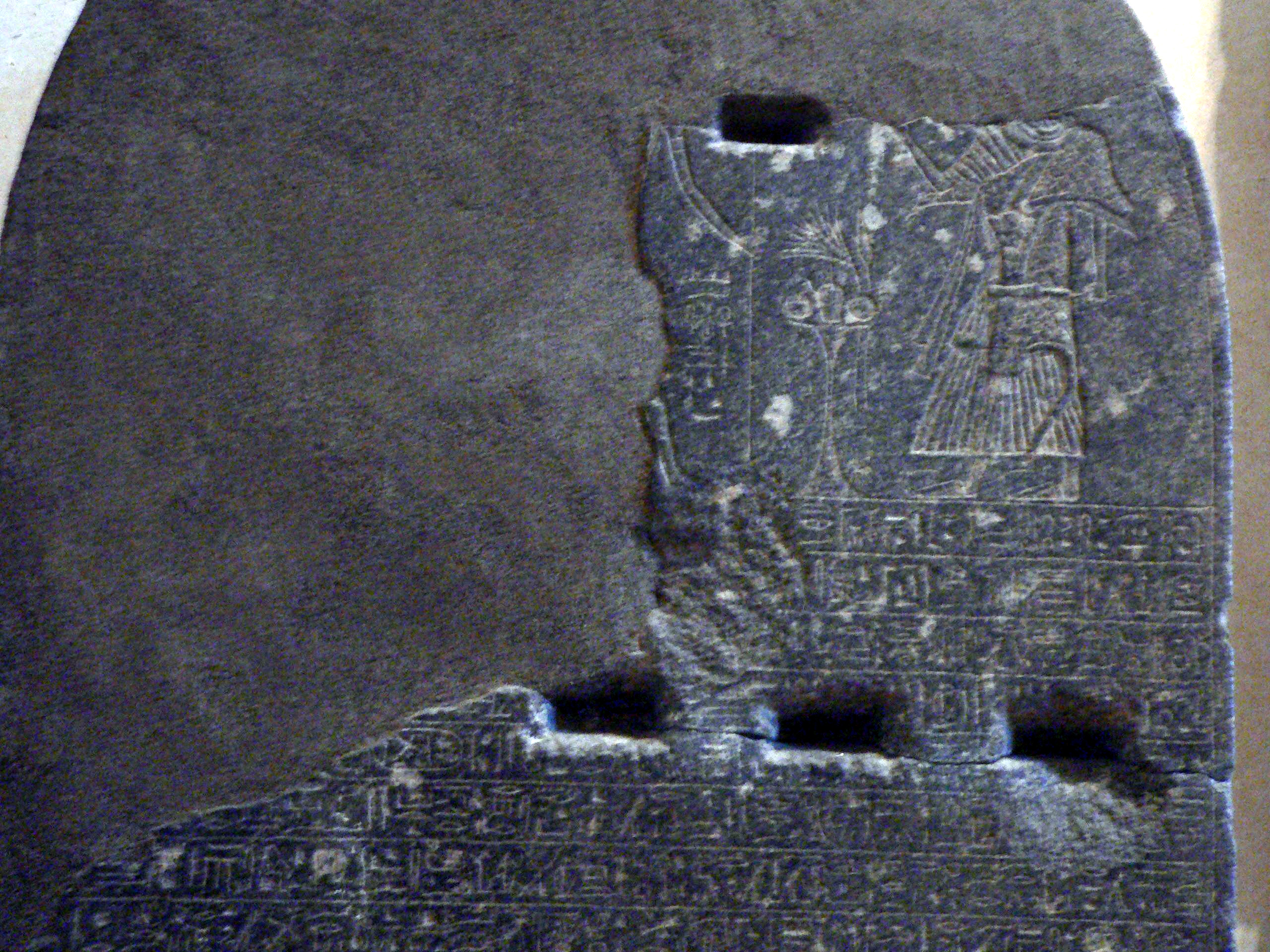
Detail of the Banishment Stela, which bears the highest known regnal date (25 years) of Smendes. Louvre, C 256

This figure is supported by the Year 25 date on the Banishment Stela which recounts that the High Priest Menkheperre suppressed a local revolt in Thebes in Year 25 of a king who can only be Smendes because there is no evidence that the High Priests counted their own regnal years even when they assumed royal titles like Pinedjem I did. Menkheperre then exiled the leaders of the rebellion to the Western Desert Oases. These individuals were pardoned several years later during the reign of Smendes' successor, Amenemnisu.

=== Succession ===
On the death of Smendes in 1052 BC, he was succeeded by Neferkare Amenemnisu, who may have been this king's son.

== Burial ==
At Tanis(?), the Tomb of Smendes has not been found.

=== Funerary goods ===
Only one funerary object can be linked to Smendes. Of unknown provenance, an alabaster Canopic Jar of Nesibanebdjedet (Smendes) inscribed for Qebehsenuef, embodiment and protector of the liver, presumably from Tanis, currently resides in the Metropolitan Museum of Art (acc. no. 47.60). Thus, he would have built a tomb in Tanis and later buried there with his liver placed in this canopic jar. The lid was missing. This may indicate his tomb was looted in antiquity, but this hypothesis is unproven.
