= Pinedjem II =

Egyptian high priest of Amun

- High Priest of Amun
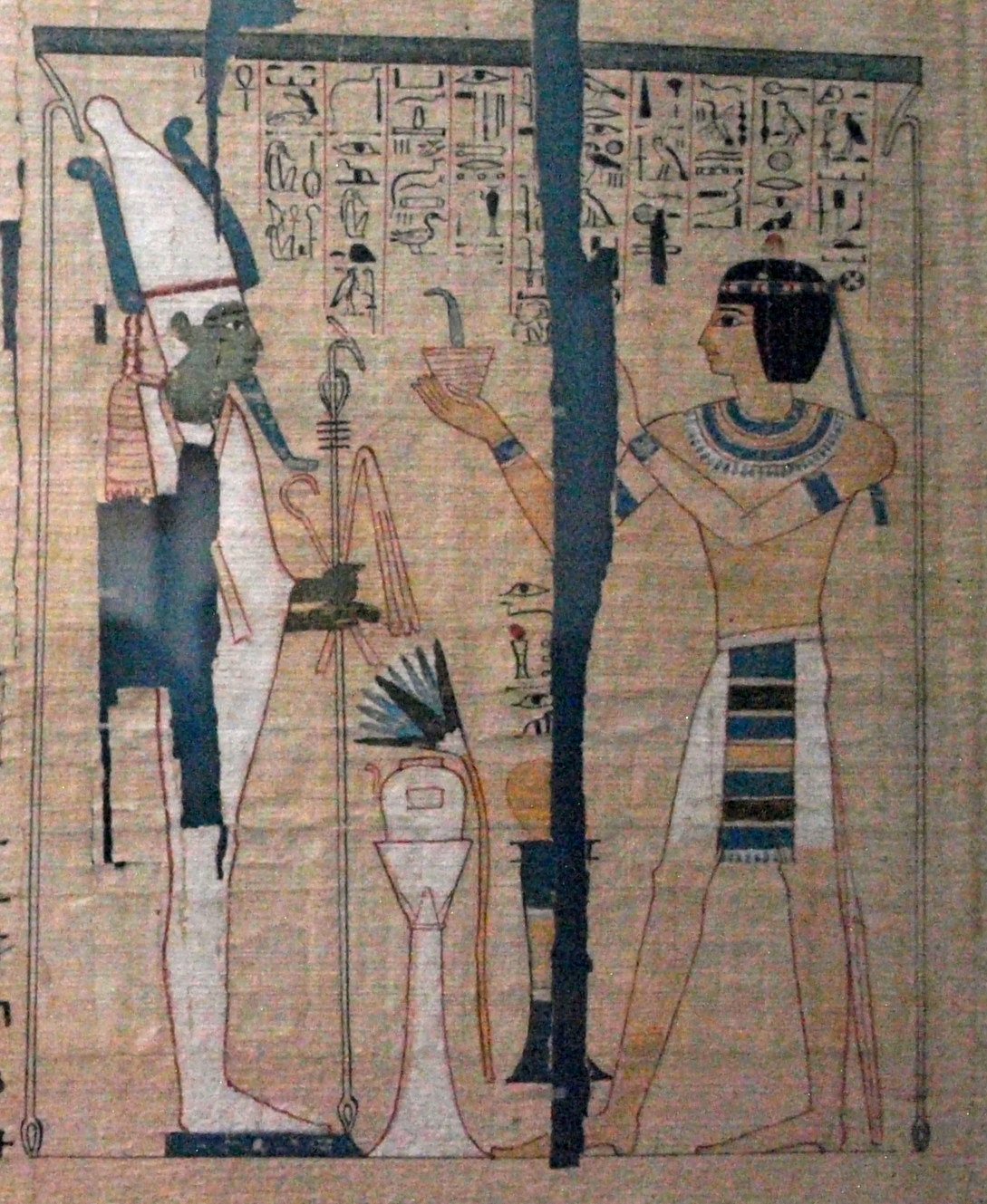
- Pinedjem II as Theban High Priest of Amun. From his Book of the Dead in the British Museum known as the Campbell Papyrus
- Tenure: 990–976 BC
- Predecessor: Smendes II
- Successor: Psusennes III
- Burial: DB320
- Spouse: Isetemkheb D; Neskhons
- Father: Menkheperre
- Mother: Isetemkheb III (C)
- Children: Psusennes II; Herwebenkhet; Henuttawy D?; Tjanefer; Masaharta; Itawy; Nesitanebetashru

Pinedjem II was a High Priest of Amun at Thebes in Ancient Egypt from 990 BC to 969 BC and was the de facto ruler of the south of the country.

== Life ==
He was married to his full sister Isetemkheb D (both children of Menkheperre, the High Priest of Amun at Thebes, by Isetemkheb III, hence both nephew, niece and grandchildren of Psusennes I and also to his niece Nesikhons, the daughter of his brother Smendes II. He succeeded Smendes II, who had a short rule.

His children by Isetemkheb D were:

- Psusennes II
- Herwebenkhet, a Chantress of Amun; buried at Bab el-Gasus
- (?) Henuttawy, God's Wife of Amun

By Neskhons he had four children: two sons, Tjanefer and Masaharta, and two daughters, Itawy and Nesitanebetashru.

When Pinedjem II died, his mummy, along with those of his wives and at least one daughter, Nesitanebetashru, were interred in the tomb DB320 at Deir el-Bahri, above the Mortuary Temple of Hatshepsut. Subsequently, the mummies of other previous Theban-based rulers, including the much earlier New Kingdom pharaohs Ahmose I, Amenhotep I, Thutmose II, Thutmose III, Ramesses I, Seti I, Ramesses II, and Ramesses IX were gathered together and also laid in this tomb, which was revealed in 1881. This was done to prevent their remains from being robbed as their graves have been looted by many ancient tomb raiders.

== Pinedjem's timeline ==
Pinedjem II was a contemporary of the Egyptian king Siamun with Pinedjem II controlling Upper Egypt and Siamun ruling over Lower Egypt. Egypt would only be reunified 30 to 40 years later under Shoshenq I.

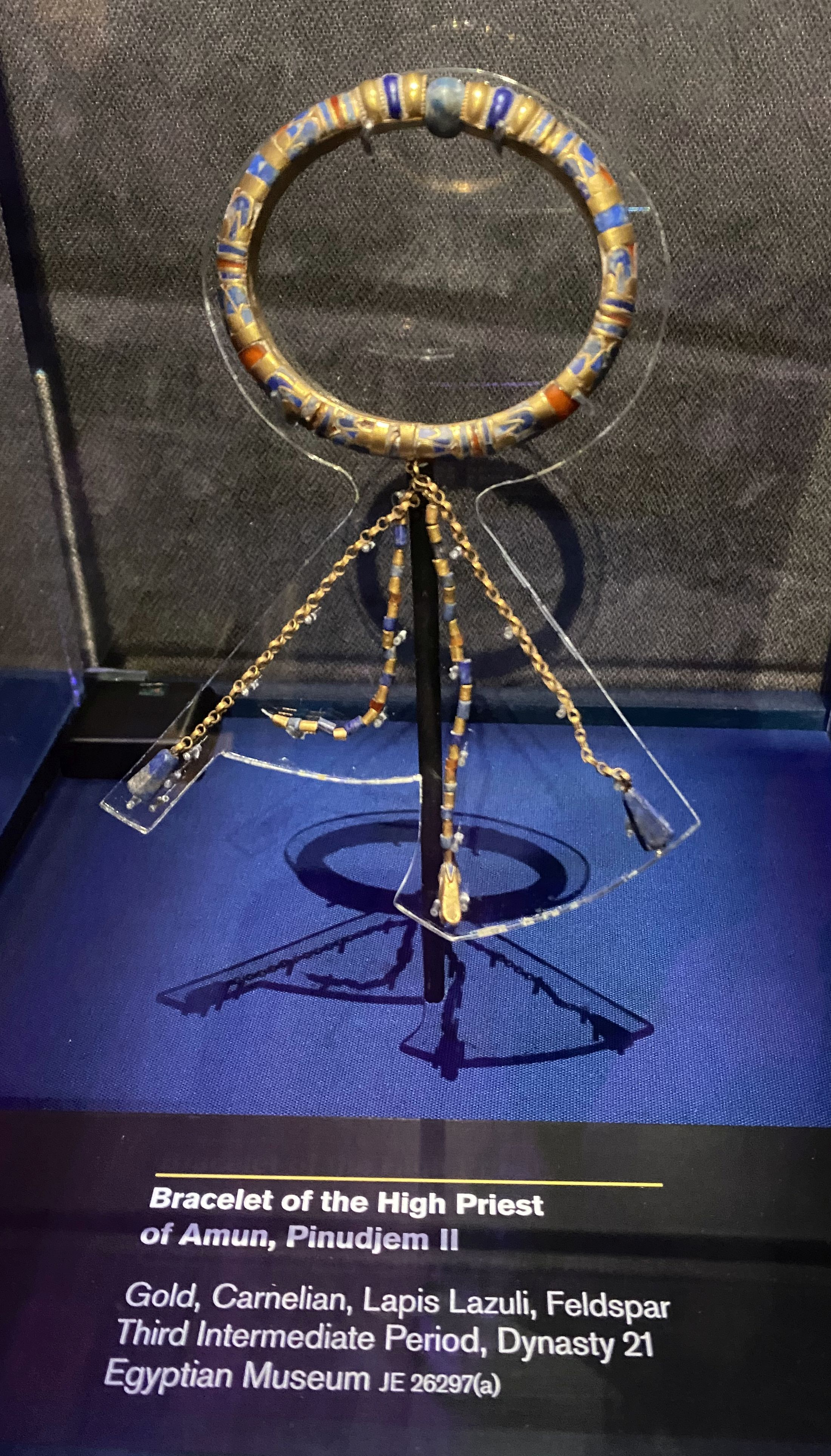
Pinedjem II's bracelet on his mummy in the Royal Cache

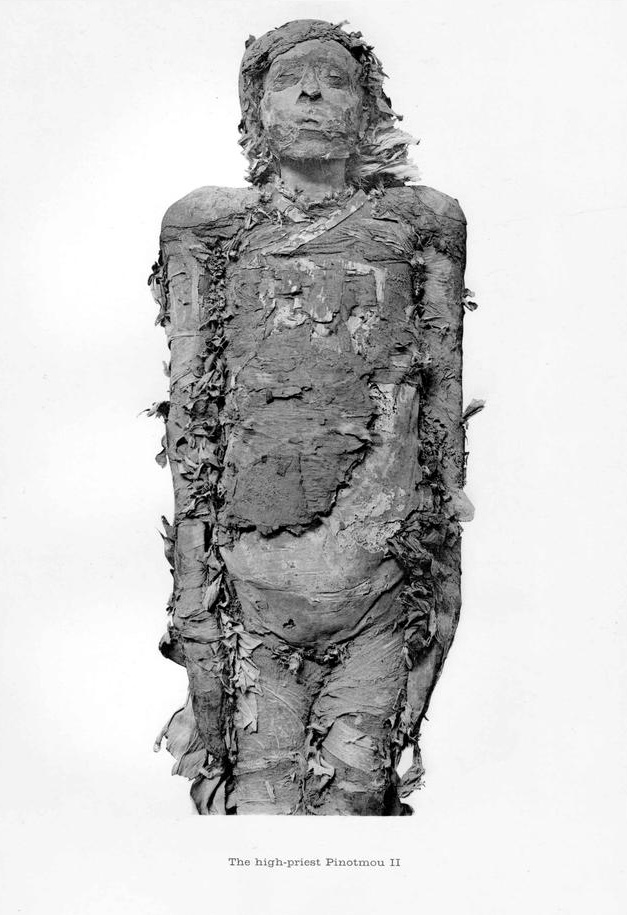
Mummy of Pinedjem II
