= Second Prophet of Amun =

Ancient Egyptian priestly title

The Second Prophet of Amun (hm netjer sen-nu en Amun), also called the Second Priest of Amun, was a high ranking priestly official in the cult of the ancient Egyptian god Amun. The Second Prophet of Amun office was created in the New Kingdom, at the beginning of the Eighteenth Dynasty.

== History ==
=== New Kingdom ===
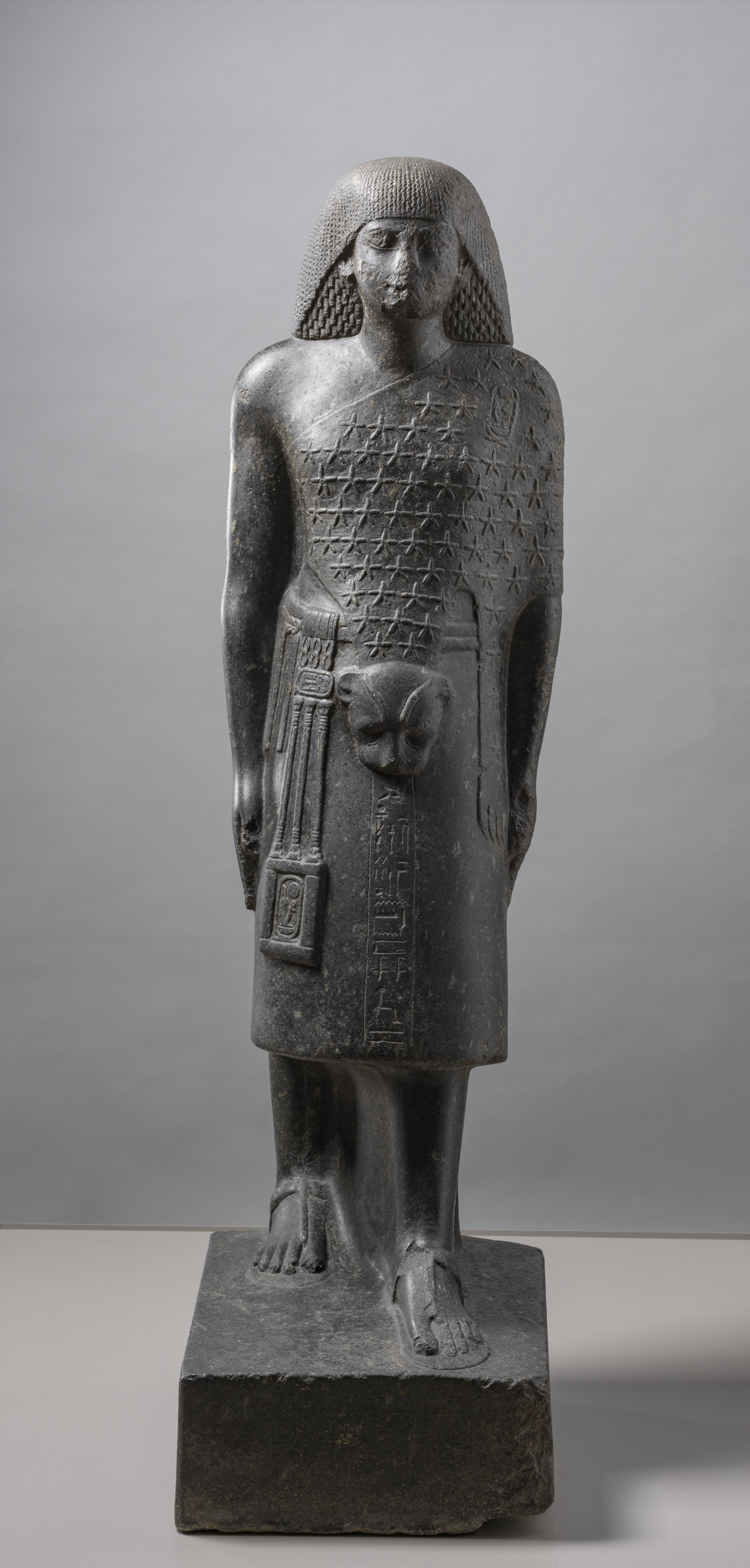
Second Prophet of Amun Anen. Brother of Queen Tiye.

The office of second prophet of Amun was created in the beginning of the 18th Dynasty during the reign of Ahmose I. A donation stela from Karnak records how king Ahmose purchased the office of Second Prophet of Amun and endowed the position with land, goods and administrators. The position of Second Prophet of Amun was put under the authority of the God's Wife of Amun at its creation.

Made in the presence of the [...officials...] of the territory of Thebes and the temple priesthood of Amun. What was said m hm n stp-si l.p.h. on this day, [saying]: "The office of Second Priest of Amun [shall] belong to the God's Wife, Great Royal Wife, united with the white crown, Ahmose-Nefertari, living; having been made for her in an imyt-pr, from son to son, heir to heir, [without allowing] it [to be interfered by anybody forever and ever.

The endowment was given to Queen Ahmose-Nefertari and her descendants. The record was signed and later confirmed by an oracle. Records from a later era indicate that in this position she would have been responsible for all temple properties, administration of estates, workshops, treasuries and all the associated administration staff.

During the reign of Hatshepsut and Tuthmosis III, the Second Prophet was involved in royal constructions at Karnak. The Second Prophet Puimre oversaw the erection of an ebony shrine dedicated to Hatshepsut, the construction of two obelisks for Tuthmosis II and the construction of doors made of Tura limestone. In Puimre's tomb it is shown that he additionally was in charge of receiving goods from oases and tribute from Nubia, including captives.

=== Third Intermediate Period ===
Under the High Priests of Amun Piankh and Pinedjem I in the Twenty-first Dynasty of Egypt the position of Second Prophet was taken up by relatives of the High Priests. From the time of Menkheperre on the positions of 2nd, 3rd and 4th Prophet of Amun were not taken up by the family of the High Priest of Amun. The positions were given to local Theban nobles, who would often marry into the family of the High Priest.

During the Twenty-fifth Dynasty of Egypt the Nubian rulers broke the hold of the local families on these priestly positions. Shabaqo appointed Kelbasken as 4th prophet and later his son Haremakhet as High Priest of Amun. Taharqa appointed his son Nesishutefnut as Second Prophet of Amun.

== Notable Second Prophets of Amun ==
Name	Image	Time Period	Comment
Ahmose-Nefertari		18th Dynasty	Wife of Ahmose I and mother of Amenhotep I
Puimre	Q3 G43 M17 G17 N5 Z1	18th Dynasty	son-in-law of High Priest of Amun Hapuseneb
Ahmose		18th Dynasty	Buried in Theban Tomb 121. He may have served in Deir el-Bahari instead of at Karnak.
Menkheperreseneb II		18th Dynasty	Known from a statue in the British Museum. From the reigns of Hatshepsut and Tuthmosis III.
Neferhotep	nfr Htp t p	18th Dynasty	Son of Vizier Rekhmire. He may have served in Deir el-Bahari instead of at Karnak.
Merymaat		18th Dynasty	Grandson of Vizier Amethu called Ahmose, likely reign of Tuthmosis III.
Mahu		18th Dynasty	Mahu is shown in the tomb of Pehsukher called Thenenu - TT 88 - in Thebes. Pehsukher's life and career spanned the reigns of Thutmosis III and Amenhotep II.
Amunhotep Sise		18th Dynasty	Reign of Thutmose IV, buried in TT 75
Nefer		18th Dynasty	reign of Amunhotep II - Amunhotep III
Anen		18th Dynasty	Brother of Queen Tiye. Buried in TT120 in Thebes.
Simut		18th Dynasty	Successor of Anen; end of the reign of Amenhotep III.
Ay (Yii)		18th Dynasty	Known from a statue in Brooklyn Museum, time of Tutankhamun and Ay
Roma called Roy		19th Dynasty	Served as Second prophet before becoming high priest. Served during the reign of Ramesses II.
Bakenkhons I		19th Dynasty	Son of Roma-Roy
Hornakht		20th Dynasty	Buried in TT236
Nesamun		20th Dynasty; Renaissance era; ca 1074 BC	son of Ramessesnakht, High Priest of Amun and brother of Amenhotep, High Priest of Amun.
Heqanefer		21st Dynasty; ca 1070 BC	Son of High Priest of Amun Piankh and brother of the High Priest of Amun Pinedjem I
Amunhirpamesha?		21st Dynasty; ca 1040 BC	May be a Second Prophet of Amun from the reign of Smendes I?
Smendes II		21st Dynasty	Son of the High Priest of Amun Menkheperre was Second Prophet of Amun before he became High Priest of Amun according to the El-Hibeh archive.
Tjanefer (A)		21st Dynasty; ca 975 BC	Son-in-law of High Priest of Amun Menkheperre. Served mainly as Third Prophet of Amun, but may have once been attested as Second Prophet of Amun. Tjanefer was buried in TT 158.
Djed-ptah-ef-ankh (A)		22nd Dynasty; ca 945-935 BC	Known from his burial in the royal cache DB320. He is listed as King's Son of Ramesses indicating that he may be related to the royal family of the 21st dynasty. He likely died during the reign of Shoshenq I.
Bakenamun		22nd Dynasty	Known from inscriptions from a chapel of Thoth and Amun at Karnak. Dated to the time of either Osorkon I or Osorkon II.
Pashereniset (Pa-Khered-(en)-Iset)			Known from shabtis and canopics jars (now in Cairo), originally found at Tehneh.
Harsiese (C)		23rd Dynasty; ca 855 BC	son of Nakhtefmut
Djed-ptah-ef-ankh (D)		23rd Dynasty ca 835 BC	son of Takelot III
Nes-hor-bedjet		23rd Dynasty; ca 740 BC	Reign of Takelot III
Djed-khons-ef-ankh (C)		23rd Dynasty	Son of Harsiese (C). Possibly 2PA - according to Bierbrier.
Patjenfy		25th Dynasty; ca720-700 BC	Reign of Shabaqo
Nesi-shu-tefnut		25th Dynasty; ca 680 BC	Son of Taharqa
Neshorbedjet		26th Dynasty; ca 650-640 BC	
