= Story of Wenamun =

Hieratic Late Egyptian literary text

- Pushkin Museum
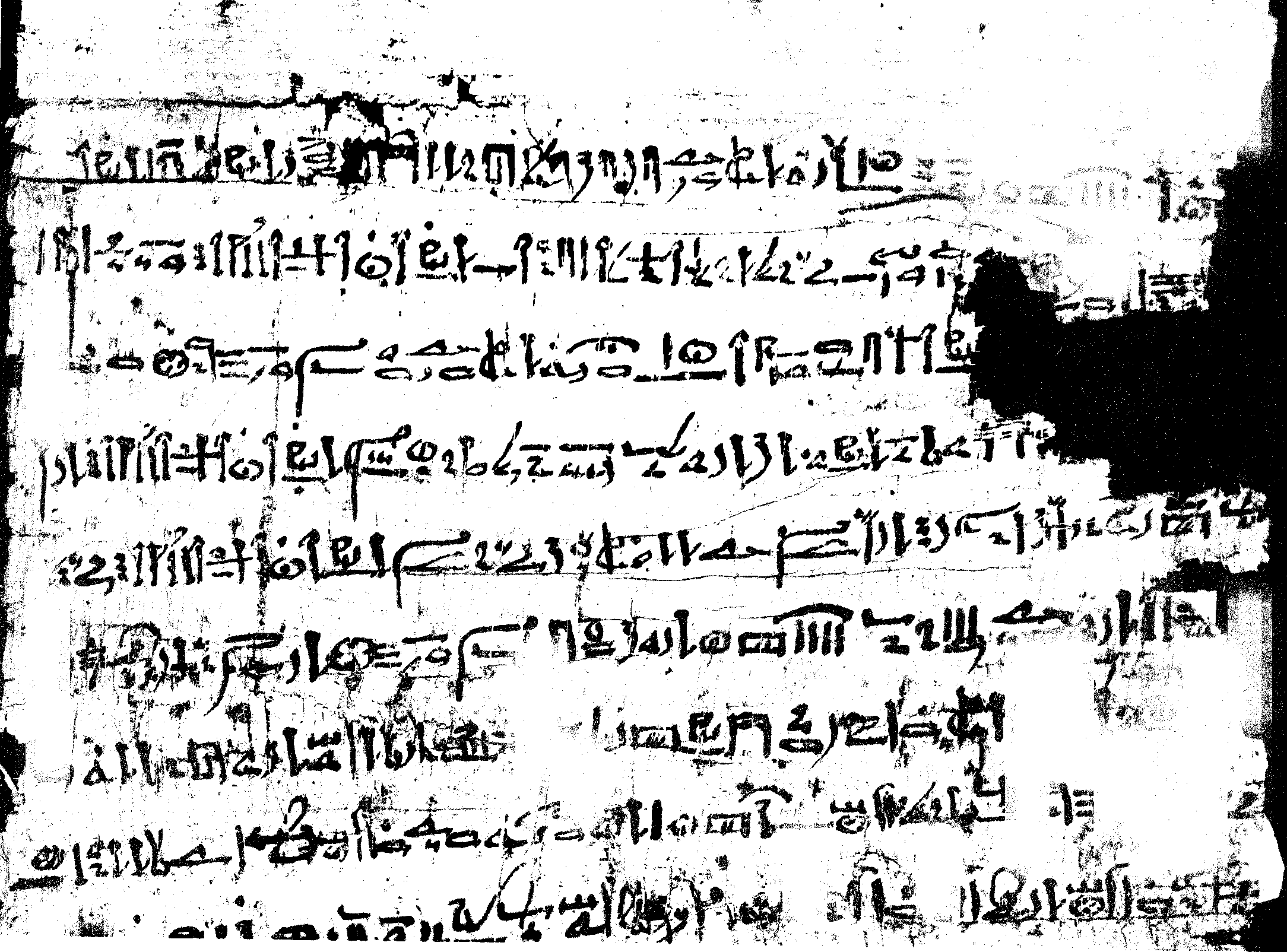
- Also known as: Moscow Papyrus 120
- Type: Papyrus
- Date: c. 1000 BCE
- Place of origin: al-Hibah, Egypt
- Language: Egyptian
- Scribe: Unknown
- Discovered: 1890

Wenamun in hieroglyphs
wn n O31 i mn n A40
wn.jmn

The Story of Wenamun (alternately known as the Report of Wenamun, The Misadventures of Wenamun, Voyage of Unamūn, or informally as just Wenamun) is a literary text written in hieratic in the Late Egyptian language. It is only known from one incomplete copy discovered in 1890 at al-Hibah, Egypt, and subsequently purchased in 1891 in Cairo by the Russian Egyptologist Vladimir Golenishchev.

It was found in a jar together with the Onomasticon of Amenope and the Tale of Woe. The story features a mixture of literary tropes along with an administrative writing style, which has led to a longstanding uncertainty about whether it is a fictitious account or a genuine historical document. Despite this, scholars agree on its importance in showing the political and religious state of Egypt during the transition between the New Kingdom and the Third Intermediate Period.

The papyrus is now in the collection of the Pushkin Museum of Fine Arts, Moscow, and officially designated as Papyrus Pushkin 120. The hieratic text was published globally after finding new ownership in 1960, and the hieroglyphic text was published by Gardiner 1932. The text itself was fully digitized in 2007.

== Discovery ==
The two-page papyrus is unprovenanced. It was reported to have been discovered in an illicit excavation at al-Hibah, Egypt, and was bought by Vladimir Golenishchev in 1891–92. Golenishchev published the manuscript in 1897–99.

== Synopsis ==
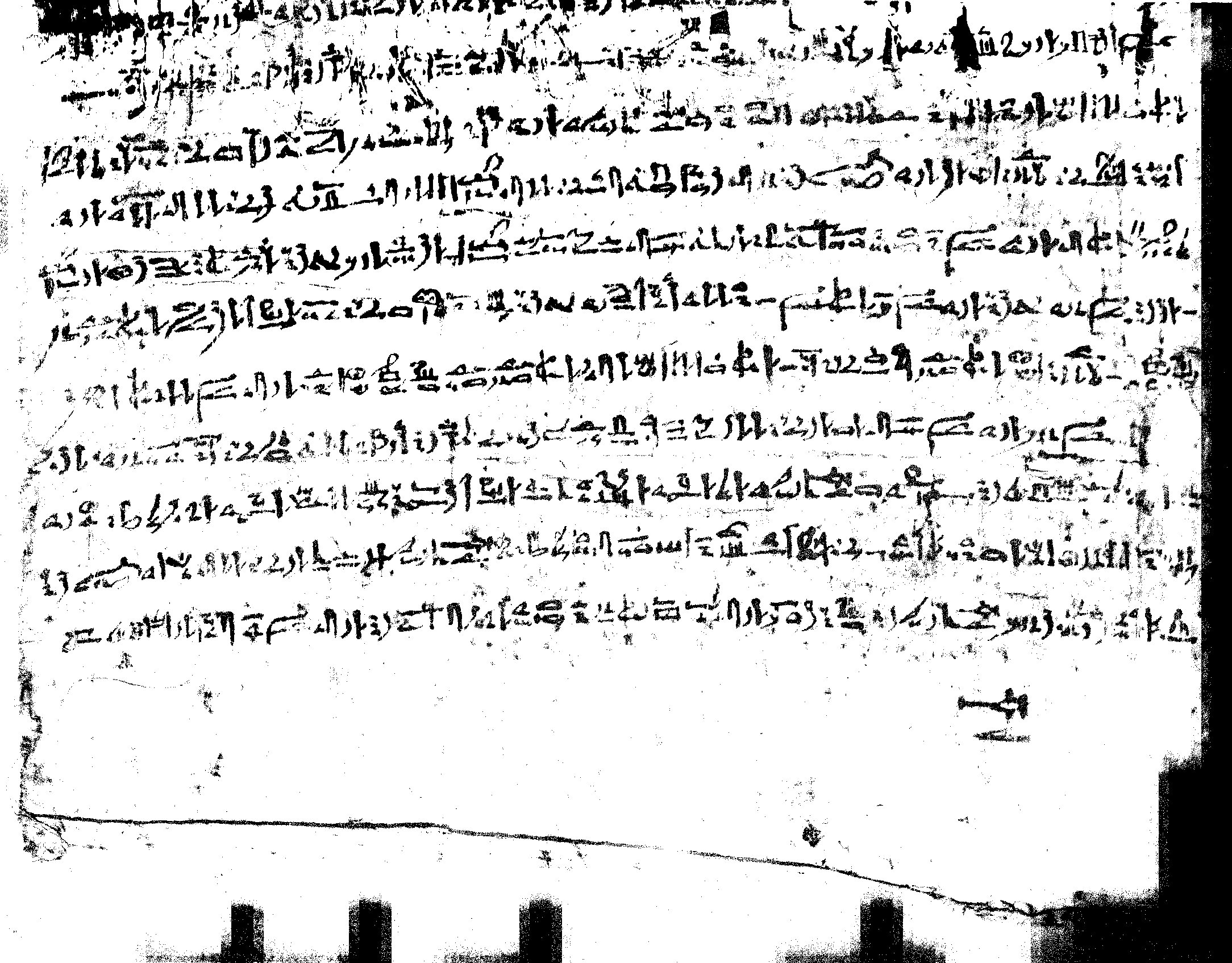
Second (final) page of the papyrus

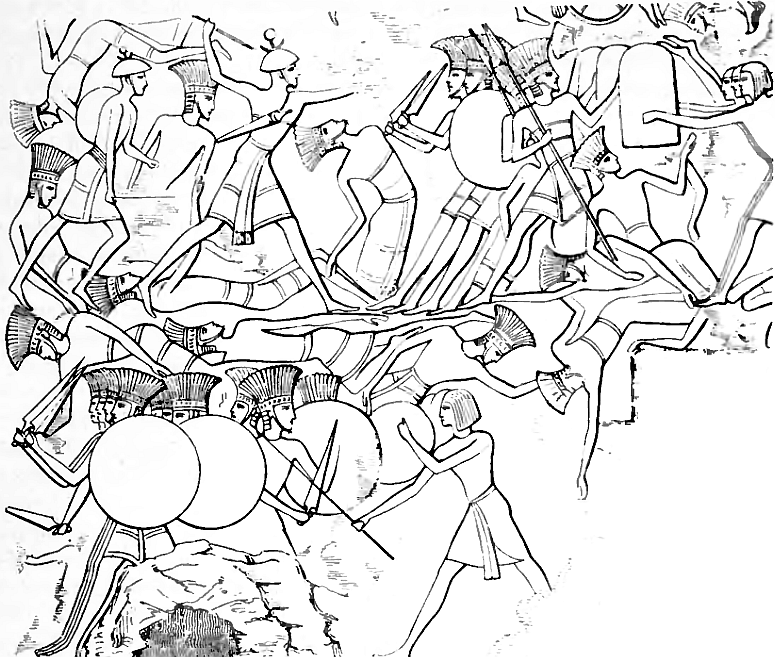
The Tjekers were a group of powerful Sea People. Here they are depicted battling the Philistines.

The principal character, Wenamun, a priest of Amun at Karnak, is sent by the High Priest of Amun, Herihor, to the Phoenician city of Byblos to acquire cedar logs. The cedar wood of Lebanon (Cedrus Libani) was highly coveted for its use in construction, and Wenamun was tasked with procuring it to facilitate the creation of a new ship to transport the cult image of Amun. After visiting Smendes (Nesbanebded in Egyptian) at Tanis, Wenamun stopped at the port of Dor ruled by the Tjeker prince Beder. Unfortunately for Wenamun, during his stay one of his sailors abandoned the crew, stealing all of Wenamun's gold and silver in the process. Wenamun petitioned Beder to compensate him for his stolen goods, as it was the responsibility of the town to reimburse the victim of robbery if the perpetrator was not found. However, due to the robbery occurring offshore from Dor, the crime technically fell outside Beder's jurisdiction and Wenamun had to leave empty-handed and continue his journey to Byblos.

Wenamun was shocked by the hostile reception he received upon his arrival in Lebanon. When he finally gained an audience with Zakar-Baal, the local king, the latter refused to give the requested goods for free, as had been the traditional custom; instead, Zakar-Baal demanded payment. Wenamun sent to Smendes for the funds, a humiliating move that hints at the waning of Egyptian power over the Eastern Mediterranean.

After a wait of almost a year at Byblos, Wenamun finally received the lumber, but not before being confronted by a fleet of eleven Tjeker ships. Between his departure from Dor and arrival at Byblos, Wenamun had evidently made an attempt to rob the Tjeker in order to recoup the losses he had suffered during the theft of his gold and silver. Wenamun's ship was able to avoid capture and attempted to return to Egypt, only to be blown off course to Alashiya (Cyprus). After his arrival, he was almost killed by an angry mob before placing himself under the protection of the local queen, whom he called Hatbi. At this point the story breaks off.

== Dating ==
The story is set in an ambiguous "Year 5", generally taken to be the fifth year of the so-called Renaissance of Pharaoh Ramesses XI, the tenth and last ruler of the Twentieth Dynasty of Ancient Egypt (1190–1077 BCE). However, since Karl Jansen-Winkeln has proposed to reverse the order of the High Priests of Amun, Herihor and Piankh, this ascription has become disputed. With the priesthood of Herihor falling later than that of Piankh, who is attested in year 7 of the Renaissance, the date in the heading of Wenamun should rather refer to the direct (or indirect) successor of Ramesses XI. Following Jansen-Winkeln, Arno Egberts therefore argues that the story is set in the fifth regnal year of Smendes I, the Delta-based founder of the Twenty-first Dynasty. Recently, yet another solution has been suggested by Ad Thijs who ascribes the text to year 5 of "king" Pinedjem I, who is the successor of Ramesses XI in his radically alternative chronology, which is based on the reversal of High Priests put forward by Jansen-Winkeln.

The surviving text is thought to have been written around 100–150 years after the events it describes. Several factors contribute to this hypothesis. A paleographic analysis reveals that the text contains a postscript, an element that otherwise only appears in writing from the Twenty-second Dynasty (945-715 BCE). Other anachronisms in the text reflect a post-Twentieth or Twenty-first Dynasty timeframe. There was apparently a renewed interest in the affairs of the Levant during the Twenty-second Dynasty, which may explain why the text was revived during this time. An additional indicator for a later date is the area where the document was discovered, the Upper Egyptian town of al-Hibah. This town only gained importance under the reigns of Shoshenq I and Osorkon I. Taken together, these factors point to the drafting of the existing papyrus during the reign of Shosenq I, a time when Egypt had risen back to a place of prominence in northeast Africa.

== Composition and layout ==
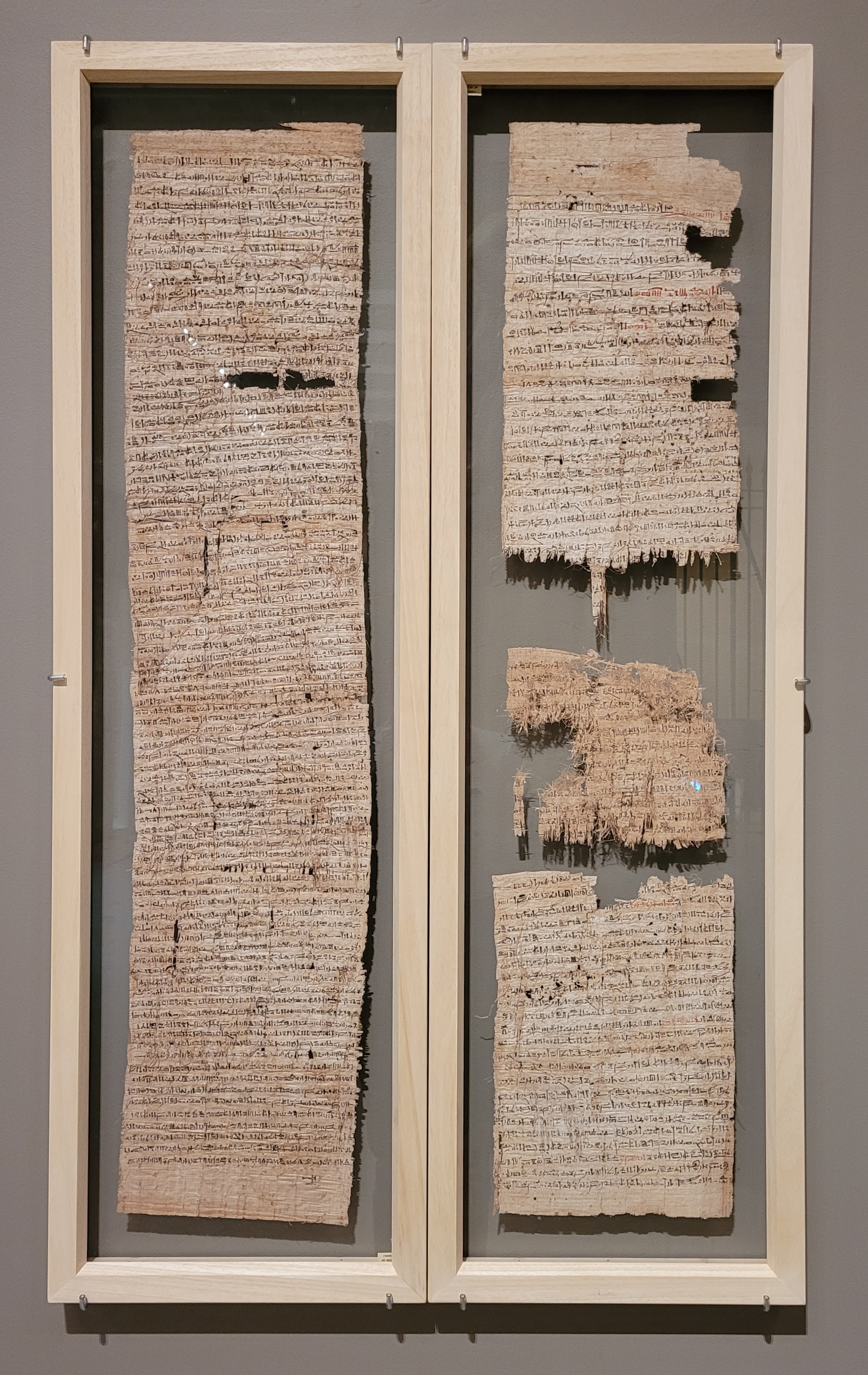
The Story of Wenamun's original papyrus, now located in the Pushkin Museum in Moscow.

The papyrus itself is distinct from other Egyptian texts, as the typical form of writing went from right to left with the scroll in a horizontal position. The Story of Wenamun was written with the scroll in a vertical position, a composition style that was uncommon in Egyptian narratives, but consistent with ship logs and other historical documents. The unusual layout of the papyrus was one of the initial arguments in favor of Wenamun being a historical text rather than fictional. Importantly, at the end of the text, in a slightly larger hand, the syllable "copy" is written, showing that the surviving text is not the original version. Based on the unusual layout, it is possible the copy was written by someone who was experienced in the drafting of historical documents.

The reverse side of the papyrus contains text that concerns, as near as historians can tell, the "sending of commodities by Ni-ki [...] through the agency of Ne-pz-K-r-t" for unspecified payment. Given that both sides of the papyrus concern trade goods, there may be some relationship between them. For example, the person who recorded the sending of commodities may have been some sort of merchant or trader who had a professional or personal interest in how goods such as cedar were purchased in earlier times. It is also possible, however, that the two sides are unrelated and the overlapping element of commodities trading is purely coincidental. For example, the scribe copying Wenuman may have needed a clean piece of papryus and selected the commodities record at random, with no intention of implying any connection between the two.

== Analysis and interpretations ==
=== Historical document versus fictional ===
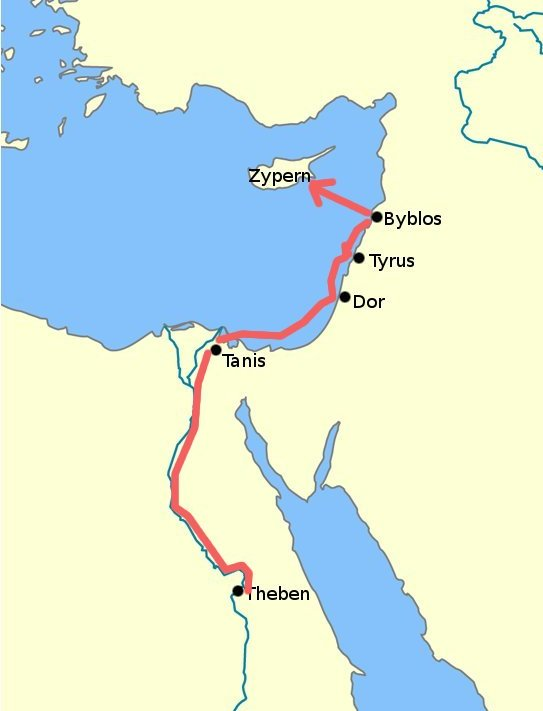
The described route of Wenamun (placenames in German)

Discussion of the text has focused largely on the question of the document's origin as either a true historical account or a work of fiction. It was once widely believed that The Story of Wenamun was an actual historical account, written by a real priest named Wenamun as a report of his travels. However, literary analysis conducted by Egyptologists since the 1980s indicates that it is a work of historical fiction, a view now generally accepted by most professionals working on the text.

In 1952, Jaroslav Černý found that the text had no corrections, and was apparently written without any interruptions. This, in addition to a generally non-literary writing style, led most historians to initially view the document as a genuine historical source. Later Egyptologists such as Wolfgang Helck challenged this sentiment, pointing towards the text's unrealistic narration and the fact that it was found in a personal library. Egberts (2001:495) considers several literary devices to support the argument that the text is fictional; these features include the sophisticated plot, the rhetoric and irony of the dialogue, the imagery, and the underlying reflection on political, theological, and cultural issues. Grammatical features also point to the literary nature of the text, specifically that of its contents being written in Late Egyptian. Some have interpreted the literary aspects and complex timeframe as a sign that the story might have been originally told in oral form before being written down (Shipper 2005:328).

=== Geographical inconsistencies ===
The geographical inconsistencies of the tale also suggest a basis in literature rather than fact. The Egyptologist Alessandra Nibbi wrote a number of articles in which she tried to show that many modern interpretations of geographical references in Ancient Egyptian texts are incorrect. As a result of her investigations, she "relocated" the places mentioned in The Story of Wenamun, assuming that Wenamun journeyed through the wadi Tumilat to Lake Timsah. Although her conclusions have not been accepted by any major scholars, her work has led to a renewed study of certain terms.

=== Assumptions of familiarity with people and places ===
The literary elements in the surviving text (such as the "too good to be true" timeframe pointed out by Egberts) suggest that between the events described and the drafting of the surviving copy, the story was somehow reworked to appeal to a broader audience. Many of the main protagonists are not properly introduced, which implies that the story became fictionalized at a time when most of the names and situations were still recognizable for an educated reader. A case in point is the ambiguous reference to "the messengers of Khaemwase who spent 17 years in this country and died in their positions" in lines 2, 51-53. This could theoretically refer to Ramesses IX, Ramesses XI, or the son of Ramses II; the fact that the author does not specify the pharaoh by name suggests that the readers could be expected to know which ruler was being referenced.

=== Ending ===
The text ends quite abruptly, possibly indicating that author was only interested in the first part of the narrative, and stopped when they realized they had continued too far into the return journey. It has also been suggested that the text as it stands is complete and nothing has been lost at the end, with the last words (And she said to me: "Be at rest") as a fitting, but hitherto unrecognized closing formula.

While some still attest to the text's legitimacy as a historical source, the majority of Egyptologists are now in agreement that The Story of Wenamun is mostly fictional, having been composed long after the period in which the story was set.

== Significance of the document ==
The Story of Wenamun is a source of information on conditions in Egypt and Phoenicia. The document reflects common attitudes toward religion (especially the cult of Amon), the state of Mediterranean shipping practices, and even the attitudes of foreign princes to Egyptian claims of supremacy in the region. The document illuminates the fact that much of the trade between these two regions at this time was built upon religion. Wenamun was both a trader and a priest, not only bargaining in material goods, but also in his ideas of Amun when conversing with the King of Byblos.

The supremacy of the pharaoh in Egypt is also a topic that comes into question. The current pharaoh is never even mentioned during Wenamun's journey; rather, Wenamun is given his task by the High Priest of Amun, who seems to control Thebes with much greater influence than the pharaoh himself. The pharaoh's waning power can be seen in the interaction between Wenamun and Zakar-Baal's steward, where a seemingly snide remark is made about the pharaoh's "shadow". This interaction has had multiple interpretations, including the notion that Ramesses XI is a shadow of a pharaoh (in other words, a pale imitation of greater and more influential pharaohs before him). However, the more likely case is that the servant meant that Wenamun is no longer under the shadow of his pharaoh, hinting at the decreasing influence of Egypt at the time.
