= Tale of Woe =

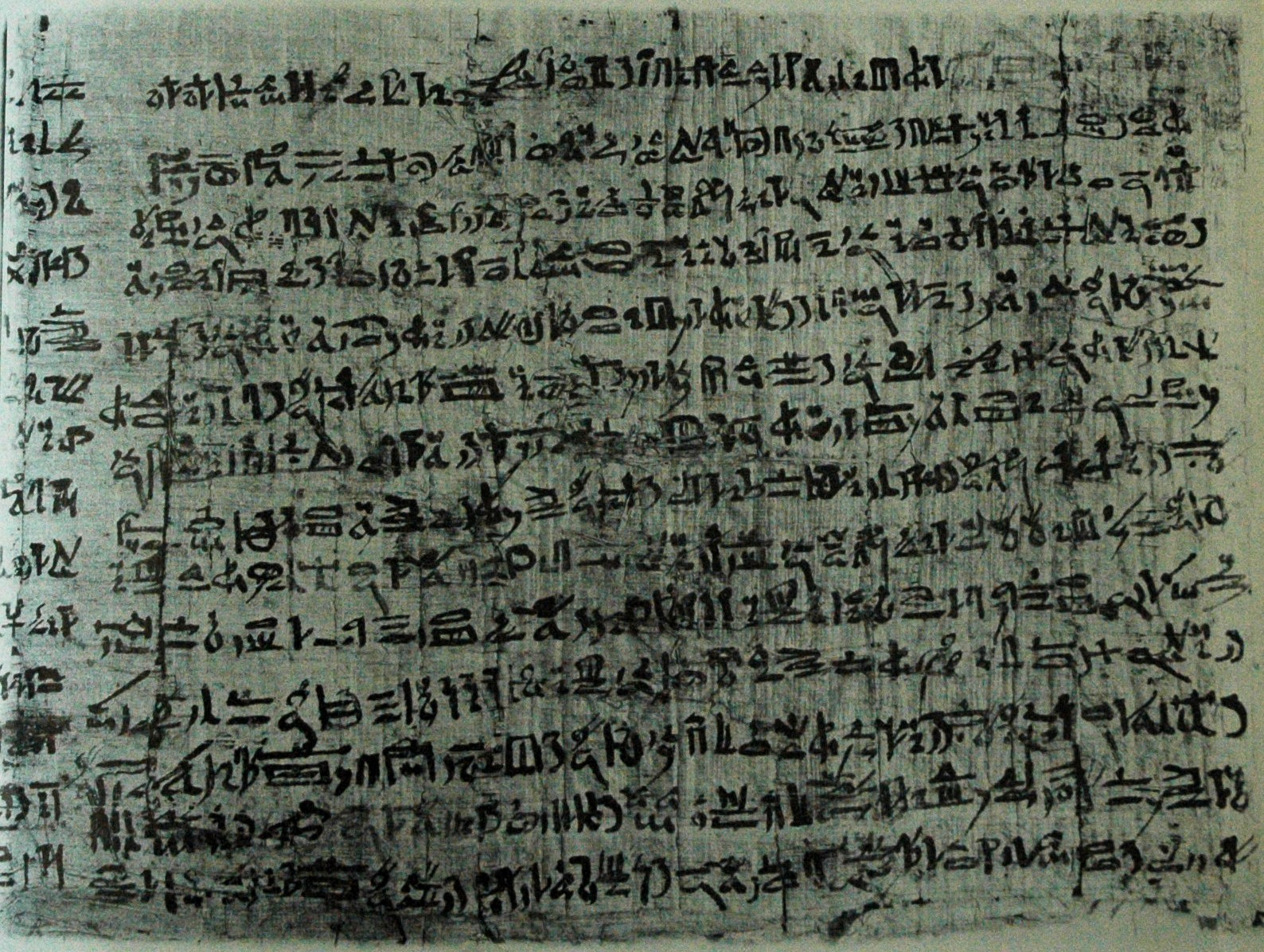
Tale of Woe

The Tale of Woe, the Letter of Wermai or Papyrus Moscow 127, is an Egyptian document from the late 20th Dynasty to 22nd Dynasty, part of a collection of three papyri including the Onomasticon of Amenope and the Story of Wenamun.

Like the other two Vladimir Goleniščev papyri, the papyrus was discovered in 1890 at al-Hiba, Egypt and is currently held at the Pushkin Museum in Moscow. The papyrus is a "complete, uninjured, absolutely unparalleled hieratic manuscript".

However, due to its complex reading, vocabulary, and intelligibility, it was for many years regarded as "hopelessly obscure" and was not published until the 1961 editio princeps (first edition) of Mikhail Aleksandrovich Korostovtsev.

The papyrus tells the story of a God's father of Heliopolis, Wermai, the son of Huy, who, having been expelled from his city, found refuge in the great Oasis. According to the papyrus, he has a conflict, involving grain, with a somewhat obscure opponent, designated as "the master" (nb), and his staff (isty).

The story is presented as a letter of complaint, or rather an appeal, written by Wermai to his 'brother', the royal scribe, Usermarenakht. Usermarenakht is urged to send the letter on to an undisclosed benefactor, believed to be the king, who, Wermai believes, will come to his rescue.

In 1962 G. Fecht published the theory that the story was in fact a roman à clef, containing veiled references to the suppression of Amenhotep (High Priest of Amun) by the Viceroy of Nubia Pinehesy, with the name Wermai interpreted as a wordplay on a similar-sounding pontifical title. In recent years, Fecht's view has been revived by Ad Thijs.
