= Amenhotep (20th dynasty High Priest of Amun) =

High Priest in Twentieth Dynasty of Egypt

- High Priest of Amun
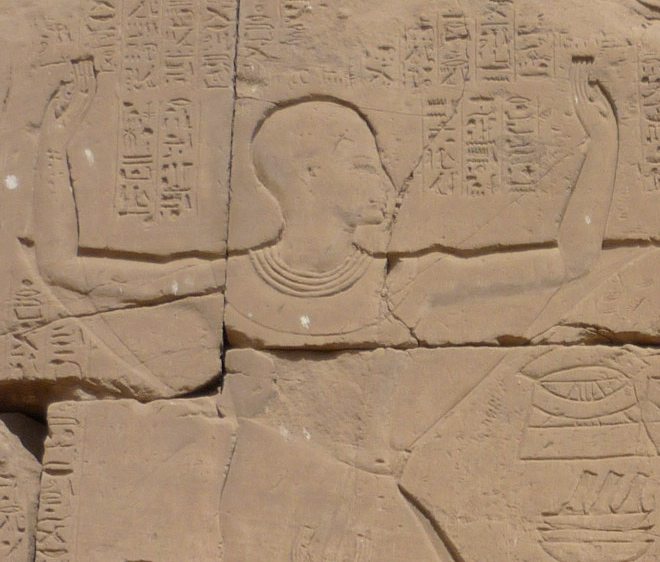
- Amenhotep, high priest of Amun
- Predecessor: Ramessesnakht
- Successor: Piankh or Herihor
- Dynasty: 20th Dynasty
- Pharaoh: Ramesses IX, Ramesses X, Ramesses XI
- Burial: TT 58 (P&M, I-1, 1994, p. 119)
- Father: Ramessesnakht
- Mother: Adjedet-Aat

Amenhotep was the High Priest of Amun towards the end of the Twentieth Dynasty of Egypt, serving under Ramesses IX, Ramesses X and Ramesses XI. He was the son of Ramessesnakht, the previous high priest of Amun. It is not beyond dispute who succeeded him in office. For a long time it was assumed that he was followed by the High Priest Herihor. However, Karl Jansen-Winkeln has suggested that Amenhotep was instead succeeded by the High Priest Piankh. We know the names of several of his brothers and a sister:

- his (eldest?) brother, the prophet of Amun Meribast II
- his brother, the Chief Steward Usimarenakth II
- his sister Aatmeret I
- his brother, the Second Prophet of Amun Nesamun I (see below)

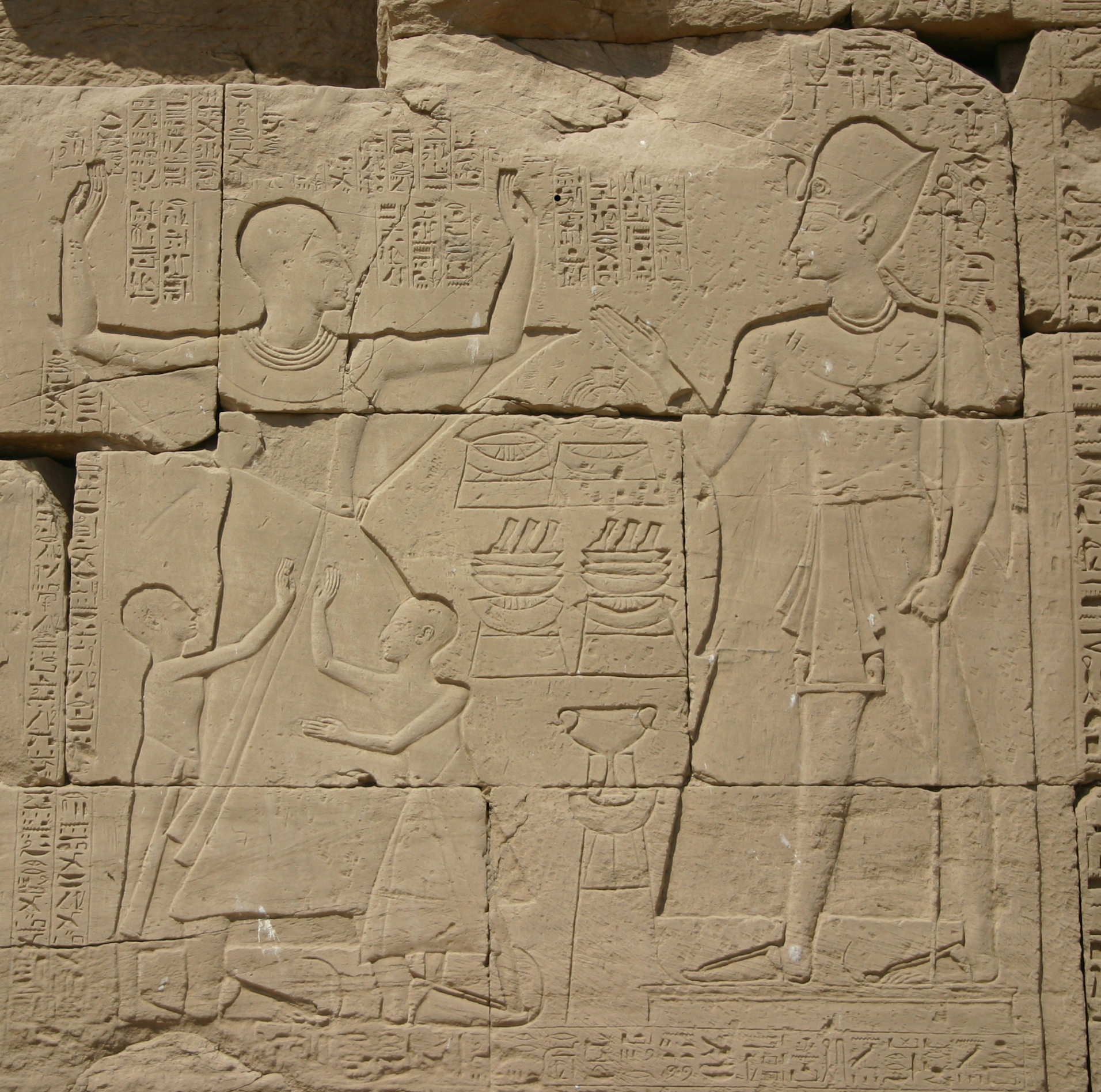
Amenhotep and Ramesses IX

== The "Transgression against the High Priest" ==
From several references in the Tomb Robbery Papyri (Pap. Mayer A; Pap. B.M. 10383; Pap. B.M. 10052) it can be deduced that, sometime prior to the start of the era known as the Wehem Mesut, the Viceroy of Kush Pinehesy attacked Thebes and removed the High Priest Amenhotep from office.

During the first decades of the 20th century there was much confusion about both the date of what became called "the Suppression" and about the exact role played by Pinehesy. Whereas an early Egyptologist, Wilhelm Spiegelberg, assumed that it was Amenhotep himself who rebelled, Sethe showed that Amenhotep was the victim rather than the oppressor. More often than not "the Suppression" was placed in the reign of Ramesses IX or in the early years of Ramesses XI. It is now commonly accepted that the Suppression took place only shortly before the Wehem Mesut, which started in year 19 of Ramesses XI. It has been suggested that this "Renaissance" may have been proclaimed to mark the end of a troublesome period of which the removal from office of Amenhotep was a part.

In a very detailed study, Kim Ridealgh has shown that the traditional translation "suppression" of the Egyptian term "thj" is misleading, since it suggests that Amenhotep was somehow besieged and/or robbed of his freedom. The term rather denotes a more general act of aggression. Therefore, a more neutral translation like "transgression against the High Priest" is to be preferred.

It is not known who exactly ended "the transgression". It seems certain, however, that Pinehasy fled south and managed to maintain a powerbase in Nubia at least until year 10 of the Renaissance, when he is mentioned in a letter by the High Priest of Amun Piankh.

It is not known for certain whether the High Priest, Amenhotep, survived Pinehasy's violent action. However, Wente published a heavily damaged inscription from Karnak in which a High Priest (name lost, but almost certainly Amenhotep) looks back at a period when he was ousted from office. The text is highly suggestive of Amenhotep having been restored to his former position after an appeal to the king. If Amenhotep was succeeded by Herihor, Amenhotep's pontificate must have been over by year 5 of the Renaissance at the very latest, since, on that model, this is the year in which the priest Wenamun set out on his journey to Byblos. Because the Story of Wenamun mentions Herihor as High Priest, by that time Amenhotep must already have been dead. However, it is not certain whether the anonymous "year 5" of the Story of Wenamun actually belongs to the Renaissance.

Piankh, the other candidate for the succession, is first securely attested in year 7 of the Wehem Mesut. If the career of Herihor fell before that of Piankh (which is now disputed by Jansen-Winkeln and a growing number of Egyptologists), this would leave very little time for Amenhotep's career after the transgression.

== The "Tale of Woe" ==
In 1962, G. Fecht published the theory that Papyrus Moscow 127, popularly known as the "Tale of Woe" or the "Letter of Wermai" was in fact a roman à clef, containing veiled references to the transgression against Amenhotep by the Viceroy Pinehesy, with the name Wermai interpreted as a word play on a similar-sounding pontifical title. If Fecht is right, the Tale of Woe provides additional evidence that Amenhotep returned to office. The theory of Fecht has recently been taken up again by Ad Thijs. He suggests that the "Letter of Wermai" may have been "a propagandistic weapon, aimed at discrediting Panehsy, who in the years following the suppression must still have posed a serious threat to Amenhotep."

== Nesamun ==
The Second Prophet of Amun Nesamun, a brother of Amenhotep, also lays claim to the position of High Priest of Amun. He does so in an inscription on the base of a statue of his father Ramessesnakth. However, he can neither have preceded nor succeeded his brother:

- during the first phase of the pontificate of Amenhotep, it was a certain Tjanefer who is attested as Second Prophet of Amun, showing that Nesamun only became prominent later.
- in the famous Oracle of year 7 of the Wehem Mesut Nesamun is still presented as Second Prophet, together with the High Priest of Amun Piankh. However, it has been pointed out that Piankh more or less stands aside while Nesamun fulfills the role normally played by the acting High Priest.

It has been postulated that Nesamun may have acted as 'temporary' High Priest to replace his brother during the transgression against the latter by the Viceroy of Kush Pinehesy. Such a scenario might explain why he was apparently allowed by the High Priest Piankh to perform the role normally played solely by the High Priest of Amun.
