= Nibbi (surname) =

Nibbi is a surname. Notable people with the surname include:

- Alessandra Nibbi (1923–2007), Italian-born Australian archaeologist
- Gino Nibbi (1896–1969), Italian-born Australian author
