= Onomasticon of Amenope =

Ancient Egyptian papyrus from the late 20th Dynasty to 22nd Dynasty

The Onomasticon of Amenope is an ancient Egyptian text from the late 20th Dynasty to 22nd Dynasty. It is a compilation belonging to a tradition that began in the Middle Kingdom, and which includes the Ramesseum Onomasticon dating from the end of the Twentieth Dynasty of Egypt, no earlier than the reign of Ramesses IX (reigned 1129–1111 BCE). Nine copies of the document are known, of which the original Golenischeff copy is the most complete. It is an administrative/literary categorization of 610 entities organized hierarchically, rather than a list of words (glossary). It is known from ten fragments including versions on papyrus, board, leather, and pottery.

== Discovery ==
The first copy of the Onomasticon of Amenope was discovered in 1890 at al-Hibah, Egypt. It was subsequently purchased in 1891 in Cairo by the Russian Egyptologist Vladimir Golenishchev. It was found in a jar together with the Report of Wenamun and the Tale of Woe.
A partial copy was found on the back side of the EA10474 papyrus available at the British Museum. It was analysed by Herbin.

== Content ==
The text begins with the following introductory heading, which outlines its encyclopedic contents:

Beginning of the teaching for clearing the mind, for instruction of the ignorant and for learning all things that exist: what Ptah created, what Thoth copied down, heaven with its affairs, Earth and what is in it, what the mountains belch forth, what is watered by the flood, all things upon which Re has shone, all that is grown on the back of earth, excogitated by the scribe of the sacred books in the House of Life, Amenope, son of Amenope. HE SAID:—

What follows is a series of 610 individual entities separated into a number of discrete categories. Scholars have argued that the "degree of order" within the text "can be exaggerated" but rubrics are used throughout to mark divisions. Egyptologist Alan Gardiner summarized the contents as follows:

1. Introductory Heading
2. Sky, water, earth (1-62)
3. Persons, courts, offices occupations (63-229)
4. Classes, tribes, and types of human being (230-312)
5. The towns of Egypt (313-419)
6. Buildings, their parts, and types of land (420-473)
7. Agricultural land, cereals and their products (474-555)
8. Beverages (556-578)
9. Parts of an ox and kinds of meat (579-610)

== Importance ==
The Onomasticon of Amenope is an important resource for scholars studying ancient Egyptian life, the pharaonic administration and court, the priesthood, the history of the Sea Peoples, the geography and political organization of the Levant during the late New Kingdom and the Third Intermediate Period, early Bible studies, etc.

== See also ==
- List of ancient Egyptian papyri
