= Djehuty (given name) =

Djehuty is another name for Thoth, an ancient Egyptian god.

Djehuty or Djehuti is also the given name of:

- Djehuti, also spelled Djehuty, 17th century BC Egyptian pharaoh of uncertain reign
- Djehuty (general), 15th century BC general under Thutmose III
- Djehuty (High Priest of Amun), 14th century BC priest of the 18th Dynasty
- Djehuty (overseer of the treasury), 14th century BC official of the 18th Dynasty under Queen Hatshepsut

== See also ==
- Jehuty, a fictional entity in the Zone of the Enders game
- Zehuti (Thoth), one of the gods from whom Black Adam, a DC Comics villain, derives his powers
