= Minmontu =

Ancient Egyptian High Priest of Amun

- High Priest of Amun
Egyptian name
R23 R12 mn n V13 w
- Dynasty: 18th Dynasty
- Pharaoh: Ahmose I
- Burial: Thebes

Minmontu (mn.w-mnṯ.w) was a High Priest of Amun from the time of Ahmose I (18th Dynasty).

Minmontu is known from a funerary cone (UC37666) from Thebes, now at University College London.

A heart scarab of Minmontu called Senres is in the collection of the Kunsthistorisches Museum.

== Tomb ==
During an excavation campaign in 2005, about 250 funerary cones were found that archaeologists assigned to Minmontu, the High Priest of Amun during the reign of Amenophis I. The cones were found in the forecourt of tomb TT232, which can be identified as his tomb.
