= Roma called Roy =

Egyptian high priest of Amun

- High Priest of Amun
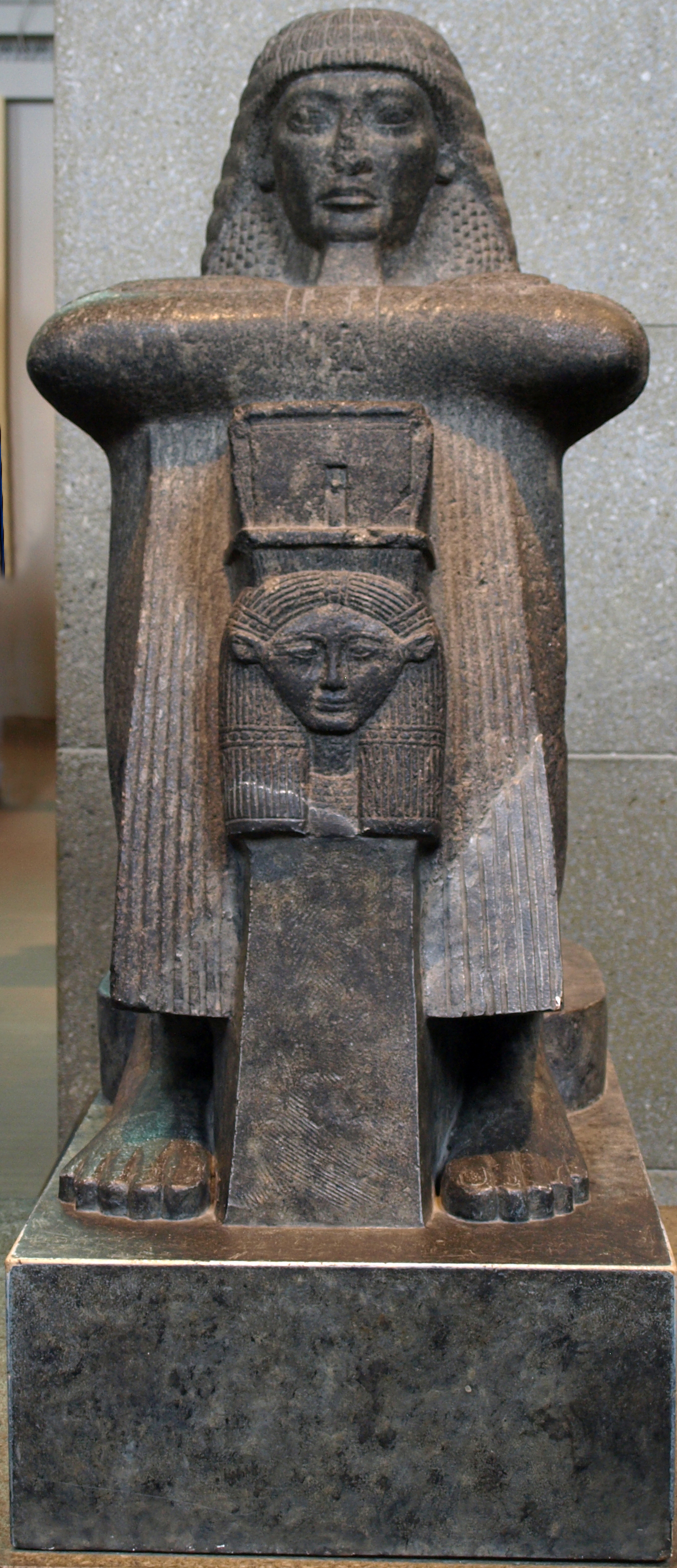
- Granite statue of Roma called Roy (British Museum)
Egyptian name
r Aa15 a A51 H6 P8 D d n f r Z1 i i A51Roma - true of voice - called Roy
- Predecessor: Bakenkhons I
- Successor: Bakenkhons II?
- Dynasty: 19th Dynasty
- Pharaoh: Ramesses II, Merenptah and Seti II
- Burial: TT 283
- Spouse: Tamut, Tabest

Roma called Roy was High Priest of Amun during the Nineteenth Dynasty of Egypt, at the end of the reign of Ramesses II and continued into the reigns of Merenptah and likely Seti II. Roma served as third and second priest of Amun and finally as first prophet (high priest) of Amun. He was also a count (h3ty-a), a prince (iry-pat) and a divine father pure of hands.

Roma's wife Tamut is mentioned in his tomb, while a wife named Tabest is named on a stele in Leiden (Netherlands).

Roma-Roy and his family may have been embroiled in the civil disturbances caused by Amenmesse. Inscriptions at the Temple of Amun in Karnak show Roma-Roy with his son Bakenkhons II, apparently setting him up as a successor. However, the image of Bakenkhons II was later erased, and Roma-Roy was succeeded in the priesthood by a man named Mahuhuy. It is possible that Bakenkhons II supported Amenmesse and thus lost favor when Seti II reclaimed power in the south.

== Stele ==
Also known is the stele from Leiden, which bears an inscription from Roma called Roy, and was once located on the east side of the eighth pylon of the Karnak temple. It is an important source of the history of the 19th dynasty and contains information about the rise of the Theban priesthood and the introduction of the royal dynasty of the Ipui clan in Thebes. A part of the Roma called Roy inscription reads:

"Let my son take my place. And my office will be in his hands. And may it pass from father to son forever, as a just and useful man does in his master's house."

== Burial ==
Roma called Roy was buried in TT283 in Dra' Abu el-Naga'.
