= Harsiese (C) =

Harsiese C
- Second Prophet of Amun
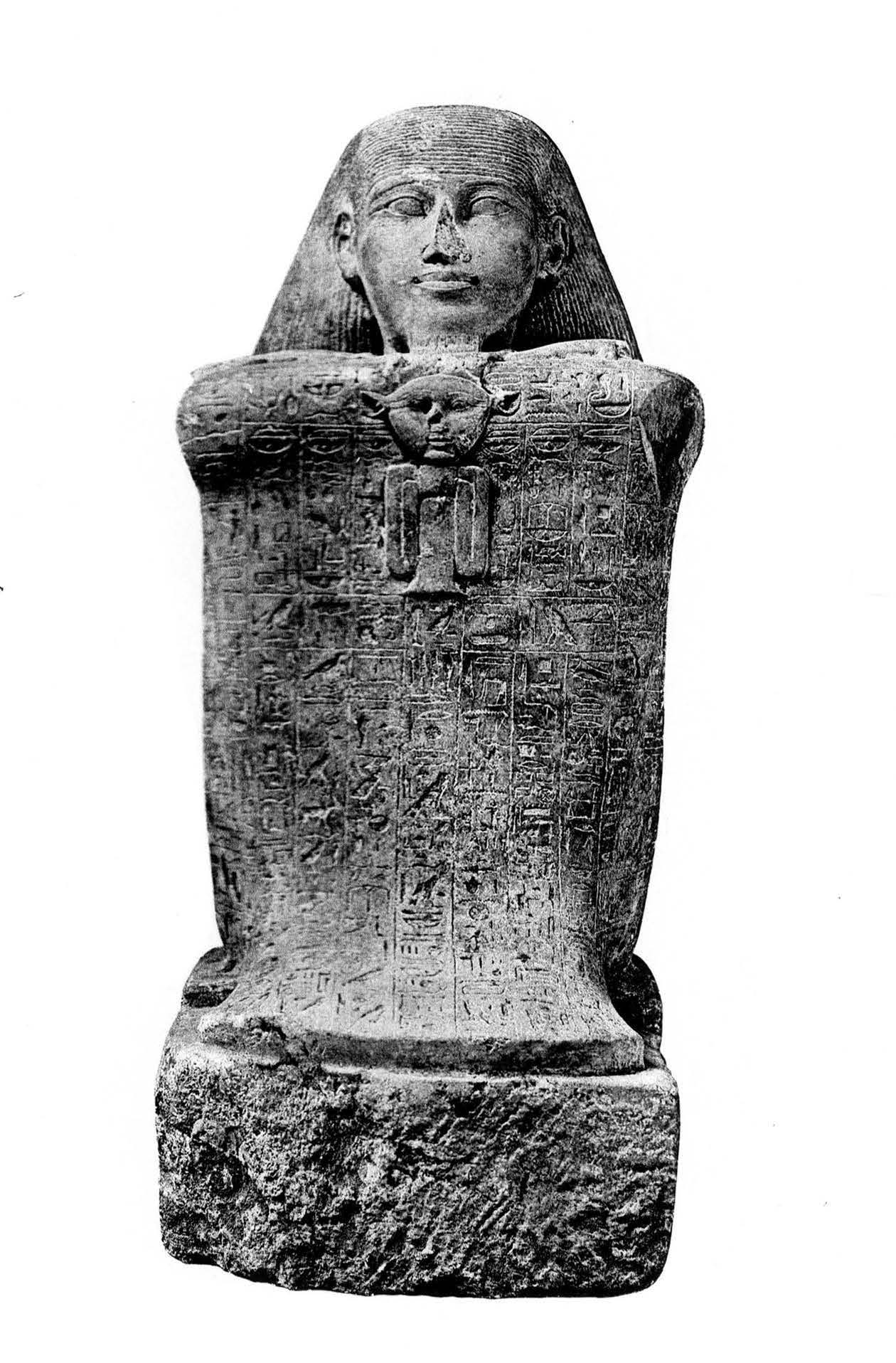
- Block statue of Harsiese C from Karnak. Cairo Museum CG 42210
Egyptian name
G5 H8 Q1 X1 H8Ḥr-z3-3st
- Dynasty: 22nd Dynasty
- Pharaoh: Osorkon II and Harsiese A
- Spouse: Isweret Sister= Nehemes-BNehmes Bastetastet
- Father: Nakhtefmut A also called Djedthutefankh B
- Mother: Nesmut (ii)
- Children: Djedkhonsefankh C

Harsiese C was the Second Prophet of Amun from the time of Osorkon II and Harsiese A.

== Family and background ==
Harsiese C was the son of the fourth prophet of Amun Nakhtefmut A (also called Djedthutefankh B) and Nesmut (ii). Nakhtefmut A was a second cousin to Osorkon II and also held the positions of Second and Third Prophet of Khons. Harsiese was Fourth Prophet of Amun, Second Prophet of Amun, Seal-bearer of the King of Lower Egypt, and Eyes of the King in Karnak. He was also attested as the Letter-writer of the Estate of the God's Adoratrix of Amun.

Harsiese married Isweret, a daughter of King Harsiese A. Their son Djedkhonsefankh C would later serve as fourth Prophet of Amun.

Harsiese is said to have had a special relationship with the king. On the statue dedicated by his son he is said to have calmed the king after he became angry.

My voice sounded day after day before his majesty; his other dignitaries used to speak according to his desire, but I was not afraid. It was me who appeased his heart, when he had flown into the most violent rage. He was satisfied about that which my mouth announced, to bring to him the gifts of each country. It was I who extinguished the heat of the conversation by calm, until I brought him to the right measure of contentment.

== Statues ==
- Statue dedicated to his father Nakhtefmut (Karnak T 35; Cairo JE 91720)
- Statue dedicated by Djedkhonsefankh C to his father Harsiese C. Djedkhonsefankh is Fourth Prophet of Amun, Seal-bearer of the King of Lower Egypt, and Eyes of the King in Karnak, titles that had belonged to his father Harsiese C. Harsiese bears the title of Second Prophet of Amun. (Cairo CG 42210)
