= Herihor =

Egyptian high priest

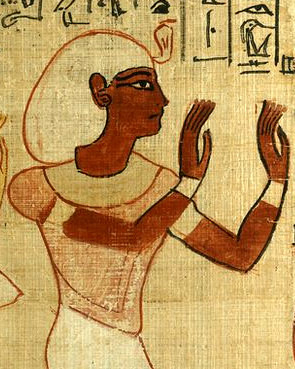
- Herihor from the Book of the Dead papyrus of his wife Nodjmet.

High Priest of Amun and Pharaoh
- Reign: 1080–1074
- Coregency: Ramesses XI
- Predecessor: Piankh?
- Successor: Pinedjem I
Royal titulary
Prenomen
Hem-netjer-tep-en-Amun
First Priest of Amun

M23 X1 L2 X1	R8 U36 D1 p n i mn n
Nomen
Hérihor Siamun
Horus is Raised, Son of Amun

G39 N5	i m&n N1 H8 Z1 G5
- Consort: Nodjmet
- Children: 25, including 20 sons and 5 daughters
- Died: 1074 BC

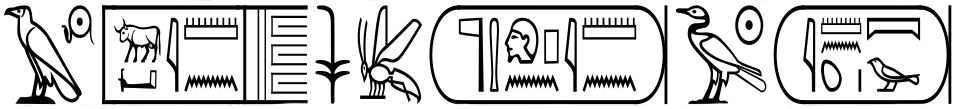
Herihor was an Egyptian army officer, vizier, and eventually a ruler of Upper Egypt (Note: During late New Kingdom/early Third Intermediate Period, High Priest of Amun was de facto ruler of Southern Egypt, ruling alongside pharaoh who was in control of North. Naunton, Chris (2018). Searching for the Lost Tombs of Egypt. Thames & Hudson. pp. 201–202, e-book ed. ISBN 978-0-500-05199-3. "Herihor came to prominence as a military commander under Ramesses XI, but gradually took on additional titles, in particular those of Chief Priest of Amun and vizier (...), which combined gave him, as Payankh [Piankh] before him, control of all the main areas of administration in Upper Egypt - the armies, the principal temple, the economy and legal affairs. His wife Nodjmet may have been a daughter of Ramesses XI, implying a mutually advantageous relationship between Herihor and the Dynastic line in the North. (...) He enclosed his name and the title of Chief Priest inside a cartouche, previously one of the most important and exclusive prerogatives of the pharaoh. (...) In adopting the cartouche, Herihor was thus implying that even though he was not king himself - he could not have been while another pharaoh whose line he was at least at one point allied was still in existence - his role as Chief Priest of Amun gave him the equivalent level of authority.") as High Priest of Amun at Thebes (Note: Hemnecher-tepienamon Hrihor-siamon) (1080 BC to 1074 BC) during the reign of Pharaoh Ramesses XI.

== Chronological and genealogical position ==
Traditionally his career was placed before that of the High Priest of Amun, Piankh, since it was believed that the latter was his son. However, this filiation was based on an incorrect reconstruction by Karl Richard Lepsius of a scene in the Temple of Khonsu. It is now believed that the partly preserved name of the son of Herihor depicted there was not [Pi]Ankh, but rather Ankh[ef(enmut)].

Since then, Karl Jansen-Winkeln has argued that Piankh preceded rather than succeeded Herihor as High Priest at Thebes and that Herihor outlived Ramesses XI before being succeeded in this office by Pinedjem I, Piankh's son. If Jansen-Winkeln is correct, Herihor would have served in office as High Priest, after succeeding Piankh, for longer than just 6 years, as is traditionally believed.

The following paragraphs contain several statements based on the traditional order (Herihor before Piankh) and therefore give only one possible reconstruction.

== Life ==
While his origins are unknown, it is thought that his parents were Libyans. Jansen-Winkeln's 1992 study suggests that Piankh – originally thought to be Herihor's successor – was actually Herihor's predecessor.

Herihor advanced through the ranks of the military during the reign of Ramesses XI. His wife Nodjmet, may have been Ramesses XI's daughter—and perhaps even Piankh's wife if Piankh was his predecessor as Jansen-Winkeln today hypothesizes. At the decoration of the hypostyle hall walls of the temple of Khonsu at Karnak, Herihor served several years under king Ramesses XI since he is shown obediently performing his duties as chief priest under this sovereign. But he assumed more and more titles, from high priest to vizier, before finally openly taking the royal title at Thebes, even if he still nominally recognised the authority of Ramesses XI, the actual king of Egypt. It is disputed today whether or not this 'royal phase' of Herihor's career began during or after Ramesses XI's lifetime.

Herihor never really held power outside the environs of Thebes, and Ramesses XI may have outlived him by two years although Jansen-Winkeln argues that Ramesses XI actually died first and only then did Herihor finally assume some form of royal status at Thebes and openly adopted royal titles—but only in a "half-hearted" manner according to Arno Egberts who has adopted Jansen-Winkeln's views here. Herihor's usurpation of royal privileges is observed "in the decoration of the court of the Khonsu temple" but his royal datelines "betray nothing of the royal status he enjoyed according to the contemporary scenes and inscriptions of the court of the Khonsu temple." While both Herihor and his wife Nodjmet were given royal cartouches in inscriptions on their funerary equipment, their 'kingship' was limited to a few relatively restricted areas of Thebes whereas Ramesses XI's name was still recorded in official administrative documents throughout the country. During the Wehem Mesut era, the Theban high priest, Herihor, and Ramesses XI quietly agreed to accept the new political situation where the High Priest was unofficially as powerful as Pharaoh. The report of Wenamun (also known as Wen-Amon) was made in Year 5 of Herihor and Herihor is mentioned in several Year 5 and Year 6 mummy linen graffiti.

The de facto split between Ramesses XI and his 21st Dynasty successors with the High Priests of Amun at Thebes resulted in the unofficial political division of Egypt between Upper Egypt and Lower Egypt, with the kings ruling Lower Egypt from Tanis. This division did not come to a complete end until the accession of the Libyan Dynasty 22 king Shoshenq I in 943 BC. Shoshenq was able to appoint his son Iuput to be the new High Priest of Amun at Thebes, thus exercising authority over all of ancient Egypt.

== Herihor and the Nodjmet problem ==
It is beyond doubt that Herihor had a wife called Nodjmet. She has been attested in the Temple of Khonsu where she is depicted at the head of a procession of children of Herihor, and on Stela Leiden V 65, where she is depicted with Herihor, presented as High Priest without royal overtones, so apparently dating from quite early in his career.

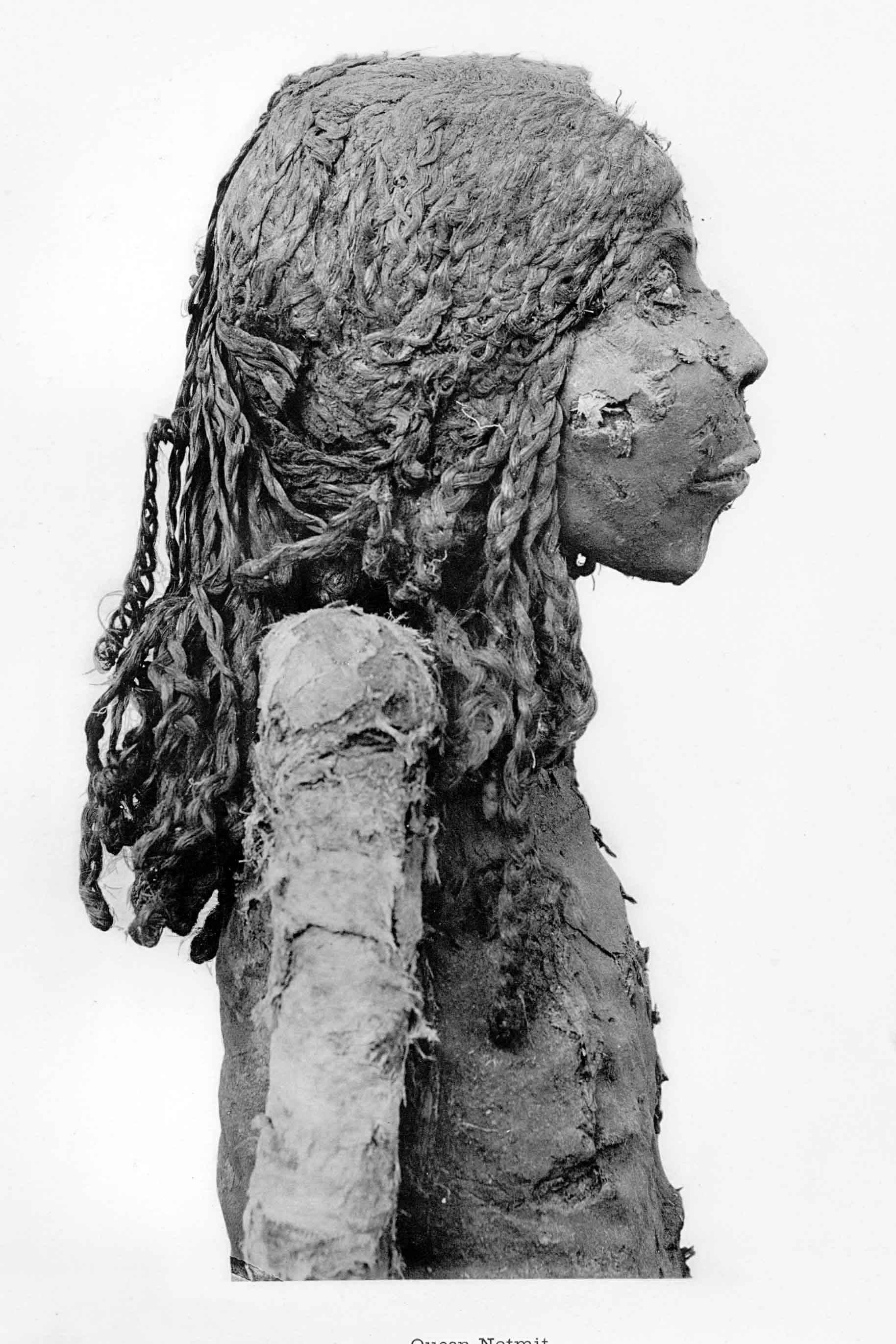
Mummy of Nodjmet, wife (or mother?) of Herihor

Normally, she is identified with the mummy of a Nodjmet which was discovered in the Deir el-Bahari cache (TT320). With this mummy two Books of the Dead were found. One of these, Papyrus BM 10490, now in the British Museum, belonged to "the King's Mother Nodjmet, the daughter of the King’s Mother Hrere". Whereas the name of Nodjmet was written in a cartouche, the name of Hrere was not. Since this Nodjmet is mostly seen as the wife of the High Priest Herihor, Herere's title is often interpreted as "King’s Mother-in-law", although her title "who bore the Strong Bull" suggests that she actually must have given birth to a king.

However, recently, the common opinion that there was only one Queen Nodjmet has been challenged and the old view that the mummy found in the Royal Cache was that of the mother of Herihor rather than his wife has been revived.

Although it is beyond dispute that Herihor had a queen called Nodjmet (this was already recognised by Champollion), as far back as 1878 Édouard Naville postulated that Herihor must have had a mother called Nodjmet. He did so on the basis of Papyrus BM 10541, the other Book of the Dead found with her mummy. As A. Thijs has recently pointed out, it is indeed remarkable that, although Herihor figures in P. BM 10541, Nodjmet nowhere in her two Books of the Dead is designated as "King’s Wife". All the stress is on her position as "King’s Mother". This is true for all the sources found in the Royal Cache.

The ruling family from the transitional period from the 20th to the 21st dynasty is notorious for the repetitiveness of names, so Herihor having a homonymous wife and mother would in itself not be impossible or even remarkable. If the Nodjmet from the Royal Cache was indeed the mother of Herihor, it follows that Hrere must have been the grandmother of Herihor rather than his mother(-in-law). In this position Hrere could well have been the wife of the High Priest Amenhotep. It has been proposed to refer to the Nodjmet found in the Royal Cache as "Nodjmet A" (=the mother of Herihor) and to the wife of Herihor as "Nodjmet B".

== Ethiopian tradition ==
The 1922 regnal list of Ethiopia names Herihor, and his successors through Psusennes III, as part of the Semitic Ag'azyan Ethiopian dynasty, and he is considered to have ruled Ethiopia for 16 years. This regnal list dated Herihor's reign to 1156–1140 BC, with dates following the Ethiopian Calendar. According to Ethiopian historian Tekletsadiq Mekuria, Herihor's father was the former High Priest Amenhotep, and his mother was a daughter of Ramesses IV.

== Issue ==
Herihor fathered at least 25 children. 24 of them - 19 sons and 5 daughters - are attested in the temple of Khonsu at Karnak. Besides them, he had additional son, Neferheres.

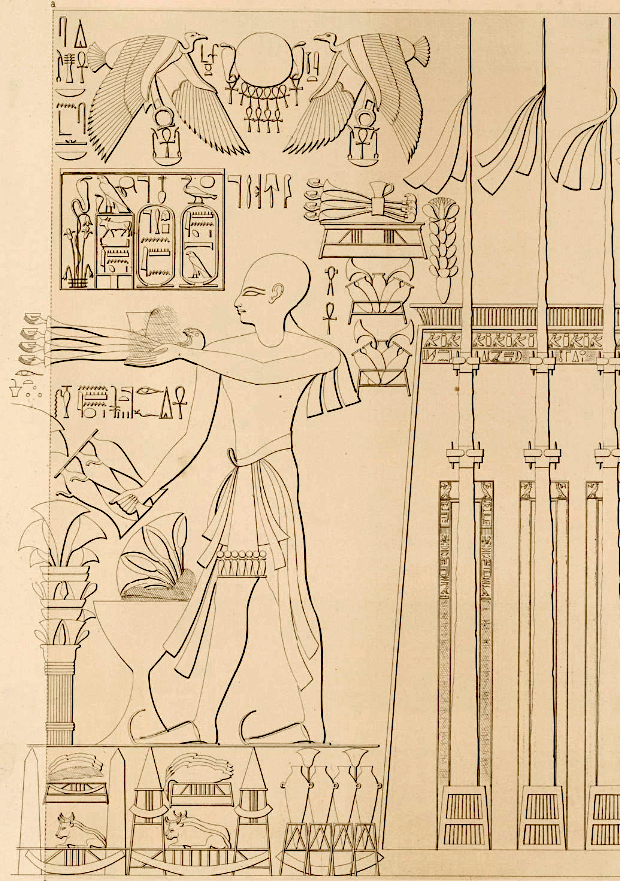
The Theban High Priest of Amun Herihor, Temple of Khonsu

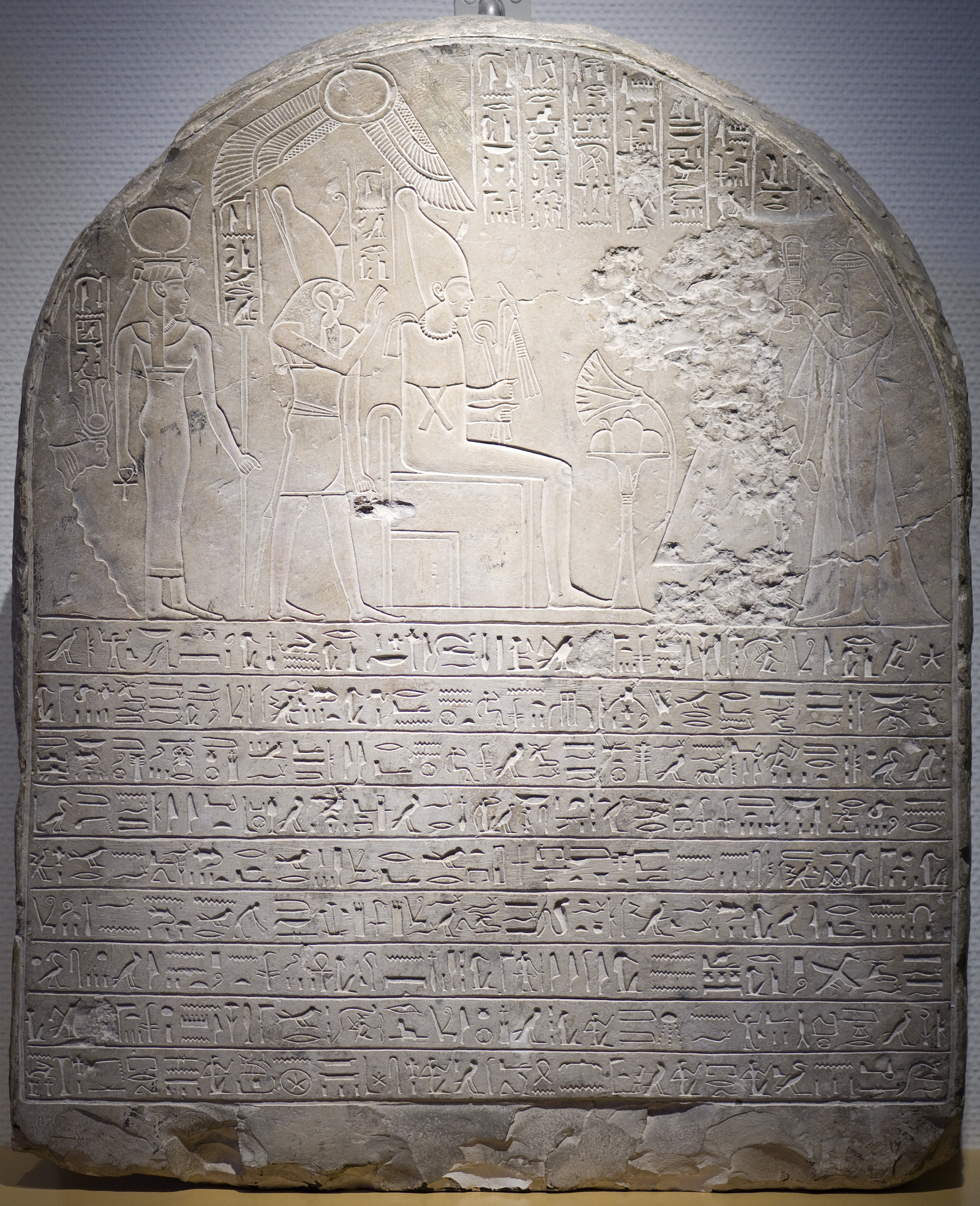
Stela of Hrihor with his wife Nedjemet, stela Leiden V65, Damnatio memoriae; Rijksmuseum van Oudheden

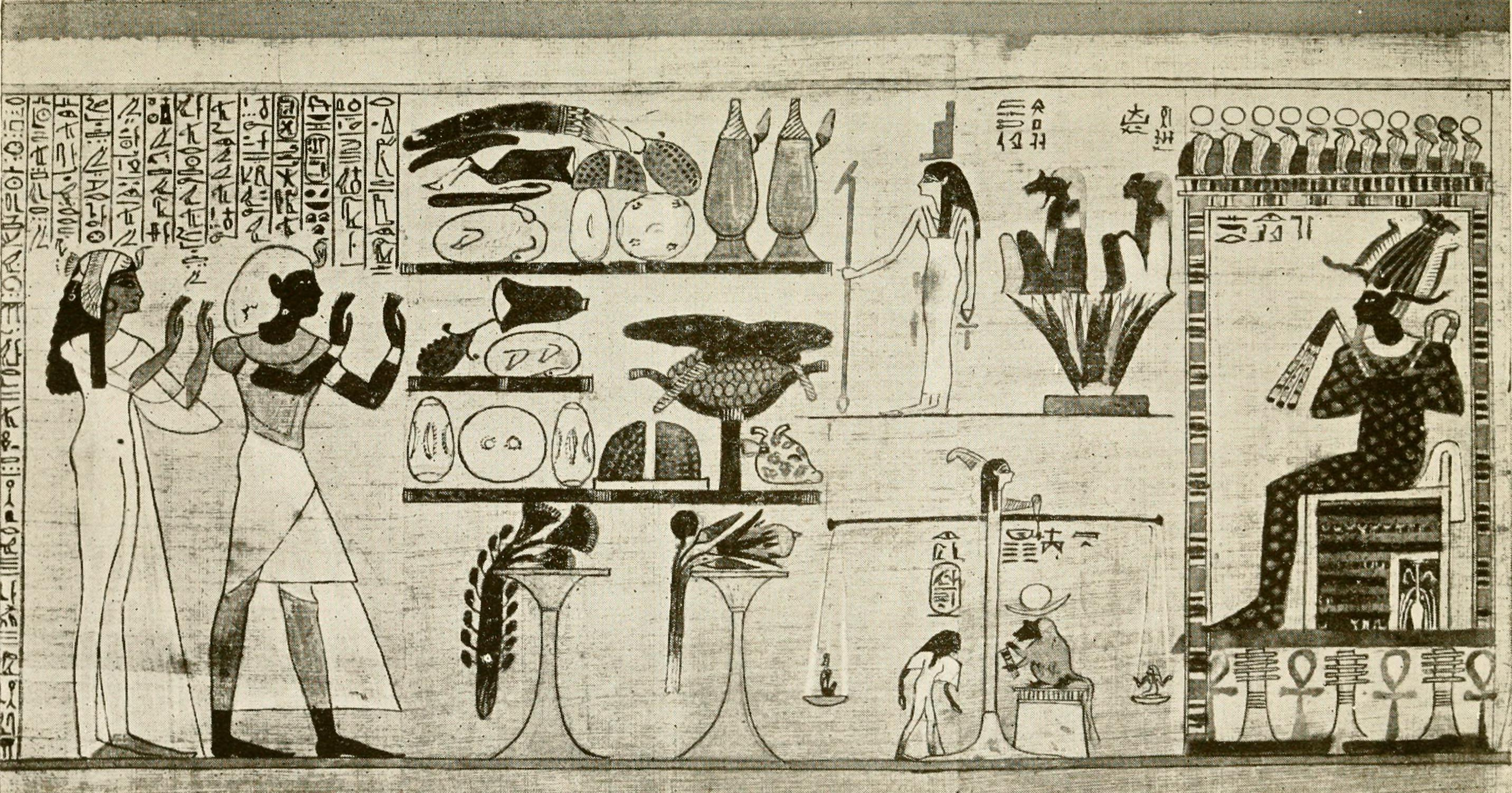
King Herihor and Queen Nodjmet adore to god Osiris

== Bibliography ==
- Bonhême, Marie-Ange 1979, "Hérihor fut-il effectivement roi?," BIFAO 79: 267–283.
- Dodson, Aidan, and Dyan Hilton 2004, The Complete Royal Families of Ancient Egypt, London: Thames & Hudson. ISBN 0-500-05128-3.
- Egberts, Arno 1998, "Hard Times: The Chronology of "The Report of Wenamun" Revised," Zeitschrift für ägyptische Sprache 125: 96-108.
- Forbes, Dennis C. 1993, "King Herihor, the 'Renaissance' & the 21st Dynasty," KMT 4-3: 25–41.
- James, Peter, and Robert Morkot, 2010, "Herihor's Kingship and the High Priest Piankh," JEGH 3.2: 231–260. online
- Jansen-Winkeln, Karl 1992, "Das Ende des Neuen Reiches," Zeitschrift für Ägyptische Sprache und Altertumskunde 119: 22–37. online
- Goldberg, Jeremy 2000, "Was Piankh The Son Of Herihor After All?," Göttinger Miszellen 174: 49–58.
- Gregory, Steven R. W. 2013, "Piankh and Herihor: Art, Ostraca, and Accession in Perspective," Birmingham Egyptology Journal 1: 5–18. online
- Gregory, Steven R. W. 2014, Herihor in art and iconography: kingship and the gods in the ritual landscape of Late New Kingdom Thebes, London: Golden House Publications. summary online
- Haring, Ben 2012, "Stela Leiden V 65 and Herihor's Damnatio Memoriae," Studien zur Altägyptischen Kultur 41: 139-152. online
- Kees, Hermann 1964, Die Hohenpriester des Amun von Karnak von Herihor bis zum Ende der Äthiopenzeit, Leiden: Brill.
- Kitchen, Kenneth A. 1995, The Third Intermediate Period in Egypt (1100–650 BC), 3rd ed., Warminster: Aris & Phillips.
- Lefebvre, M. Gustave 1926, "Herihor, Vizir (Statue du Caire, no 42190)," ASAE 26: 63–68.
- Naunton, Chris 2018, Searching for the Lost Tombs of Egypt, London: Thames & Hudson, pp. 199–236. ISBN 978-0500051993
- Rey, C. F. 1927, In the Country of the Blue Nile, London: Duckworth. online
- Shaw, Ian, and Paul Nicholson 1995, The Dictionary of Ancient Egypt, London: British Museum Press.
- Thijs, Ad 2013, "Nodjmet A, Daughter of Amenhotep, Wife of Piankh and Mother of Herihor," Zeitschrift für Ägyptische Sprache und Altertumskunde 140: 54–69. online
- Wente, Edward F. 1967, "On the Chronology of the Twenty-First Dynasty," Journal of Near Eastern Studies 26: 155–176.
- Wente, Edward F., et al. (The Epigraphic Survey) 1979, The Temple of Khonsu Volume 1: Scenes of King Herihor in the Court, Chicago: The Oriental Institute (= Oriental Institute Publications 100).
- Wente, Edward F., et al. (The Epigraphic Survey) 1981, The Temple of Khonsu Volume 2: Scenes and Inscriptions in the Court and the First Hypostyle Hall, Chicago: The Oriental Institute (= Oriental Institute Publications 103).
