= Djehuty (High Priest of Amun) =

Ancient Egyptian High Priest of Amun

- High Priest of Amun
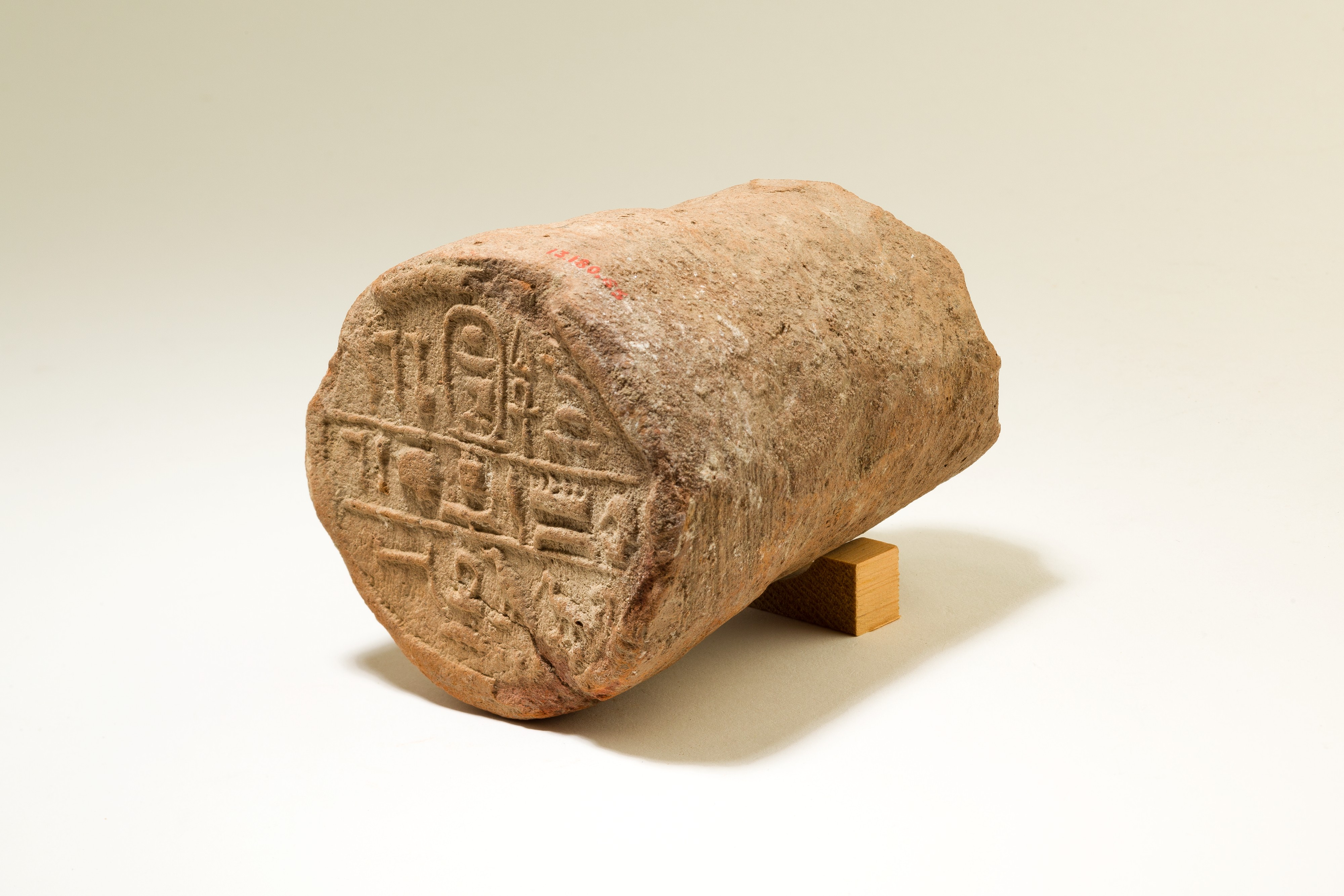
- Funerary cone of Djehuty, MET
- Dynasty: 18th Dynasty
- Pharaoh: Ahmose I
- Burial: Thebes

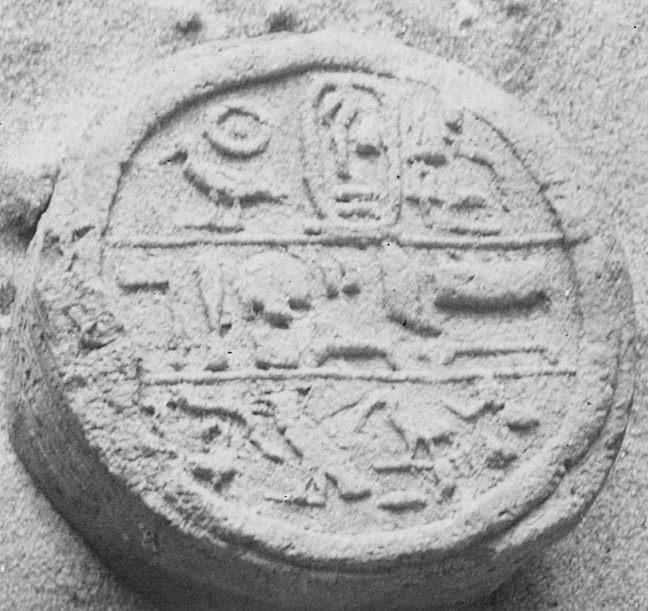
Funerary Cone of Djehuty with king's name Heqatawy

Djehuty or (in old publications) Thuty was a High Priest of Amun from the time of Ahmose I, at the beginning of the 18th Dynasty.

Djehuty is known from a small number of funerary cones in the Metropolitan Museum of Art. The cone is inscribed for "The First Prophet of Amun and Overseer of sealers, Djehuty." The funerary cones make mention of "The good God Neb-pehty-Re" (Ahmose). On some of the funerary cones Ahmose bears the throne name Heqatawy, that is not often attested for the king.
