= Ramessesnakht =

Ancient Egyptian high priest of Amun

- High Priest of Amun
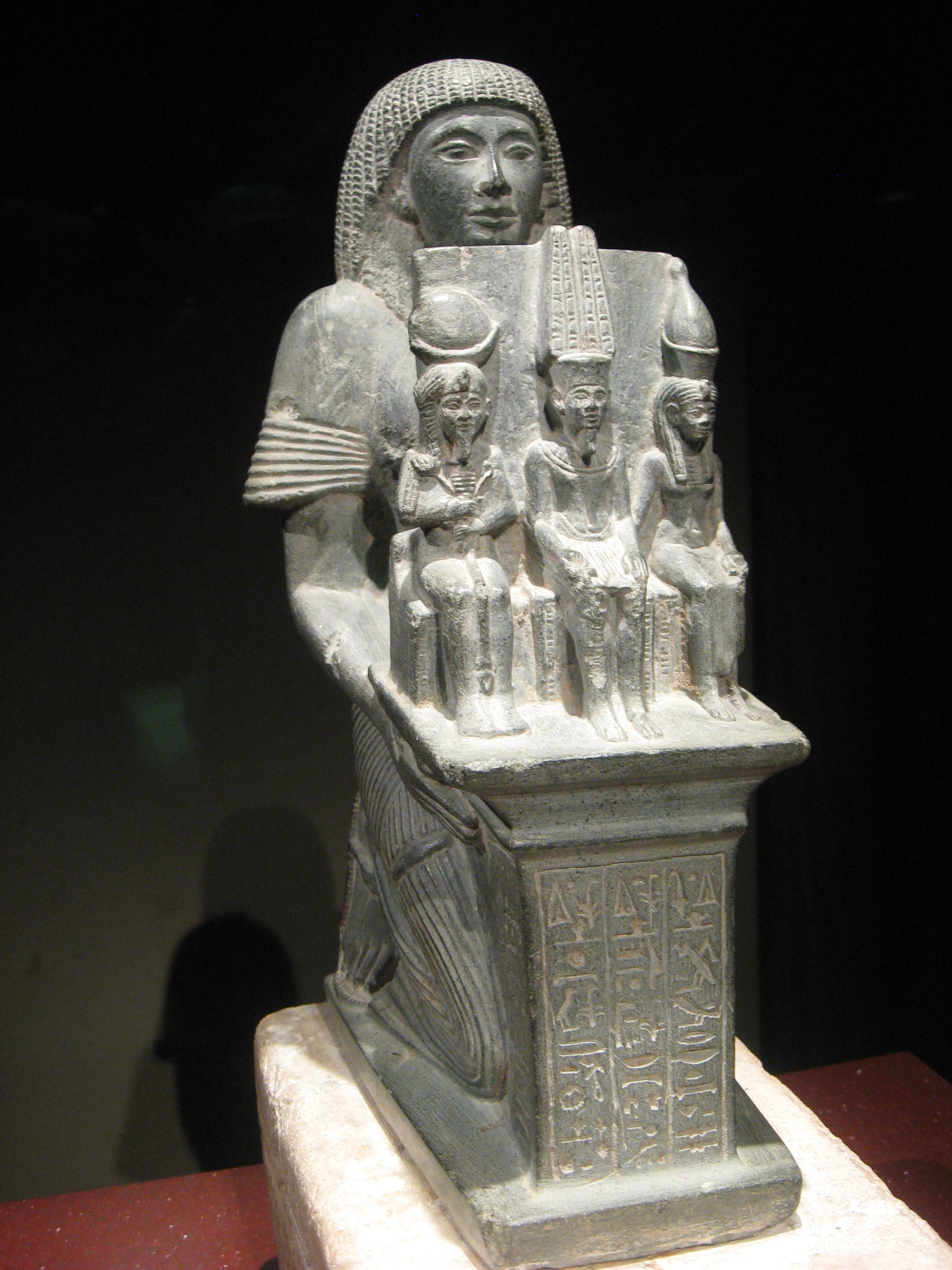
- Statue of Ramessesnakht holding the Theban Triad. Cairo, JE 37186.
Egyptian name
ra Z1 ms s z n xt x t D40 t Z7
- Successor: Amenhotep
- Dynasty: 20th Dynasty
- Pharaoh: Ramesses IV, Ramesses V, Ramesses VI, Ramesses VII, Ramesses VIII, Ramesses IX
- Burial: TT 293
- Spouse: Adjedet-Aat
- Father: Meribastet, Chief Steward of the Lord of the Two Lands
- Children: sons Nesamun and Amenhotep; daughter Tamerit

Ramessesnakht was High Priest of Amun during many years in the 20th Dynasty. He was appointed as the High Priest at Thebes under Ramesses IV. He served in office until the reign of Ramesses IX. It was during Ramessesnakht's tenure that the power and importance of the Amun priesthood grew over Egypt while the Pharaoh's power began to noticeably decline.

== Biography ==
He was the son of Meribastet, steward to the pharaoh. Ramessesnakht was married to Adjedet-Aat, the daughter of Setau, High Priest of Nekhbet, and had at least two sons: Amenhotep and Nesamun and a daughter Tamerit. His son Amenhotep would succeed him in office and there is evidence that, at least for a while, his son, the Second Prophet of Amun Nesamun also acted as High Priest of Amun. His daughter Tamerit married Amenemopet, Third Prophet of Amun, making the family related through marriage to another important priestly family, that of Bakenkhonsu who served as High Priest of Amun under Ramesses II. (Amenemopet was Bakenkhonsu's grandson through his daughter Nefertari.) Ramessesnakht is depicted in his father-in-law Setau's tomb in El-Kab.

While in office, the High Priest Ramessesnakht personally led a massive mining expedition to the rock quarries of Wadi Hammamat in Year 3 of Ramesses IV which consisted of 8,368 men alone including 5,000 soldiers, 2,000 personnel of the Amun temples, 800 Apiru and 130 stonemasons and quarrymen. This was recorded on a rock cut stela. He secured gold and galena (for eye paint) under Ramesses VII and IX.

== Theban graffito 1860a ==
For a time it was believed that there might have been two High Priests of Amun called Ramessesnakht. This was based on an incorrect reading of Theban graffito 1860a. This graffito was dated to an anonymous year 8 and seemed to mention, besides Ramessesnakht, a royal butler and the mayor of Thebes Amenmose, a Chief Workman of the Necropolis called Amennakht. Bierbrier suggested to identify this Amennakht with the Chief Workman of that name who was active in year 3 of Ramesses X. This would make the Ramessesnakht of the graffito into the second High Priest of this name. However, Bierbrier's hypothesis would also imply that Ramesses X reached a hitherto unattested year 8. At the time this seemed to be confirmed by a theory of Richard Parker who, on solely astronomical grounds had postulated a year 9 for Ramesses X. Parker’s theory has since been abandoned, and Lanny Bell has shown that the graffito actually mentioned a certain “Pamose, son of the Chief Workman Amennakht” and not the workman himself. Bell suggested that Theban graffito 1860a actually belonged to year 8 of the reign of Ramesses VI. Although his hypothesis introduces a hitherto unknown Chief Workman Amennakht, this is a far more economical solution than having to postulate a second High Priest Ramessesnakht, a new Mayor Amenmose and some five otherwise unattested years for Ramesses X.

== Death and burial ==
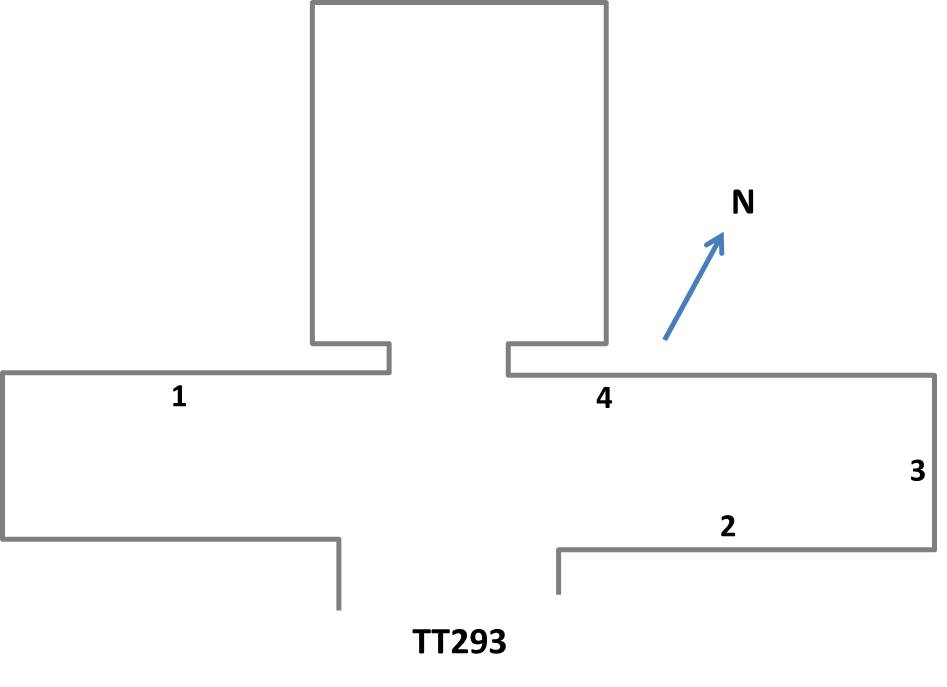
Plan of Ramessesnakht's tomb, TT293

Ramessesnakht was buried in TT293. Surrounding the date of his death and burial there is some controversy. The highest attested date for Ramessesnakht so far stems from year 2 of Ramesses IX. In a text stemming from the reign of Ramesses XI, the High Priest of Amun, Amenhotep, refers to the burial of his father “in year ..... [year lost] of Pharaoh”. This is problematical, since during this period, in official texts the term “Pharaoh” was normally used only to refer to the living king. Still, the fact that his son, Amenhotep, is first attested in office in year 9 of Ramesses IX clearly shows that Ramessesnakht must have died under this king and not under Ramesses XI.
