= Wehem Mesut =

Period of Ancient Egypt

The period of ancient Egyptian history known as wehem mesut or, more commonly, Whm Mswt (Manuel de Codage transliteration: wHm msw.t) can be literally translated as Repetition of Births, but is usually referred to as the (Era of the) Renaissance.

== Date ==
The Whm Mswt forms part of the reign of Ramesses XI, a king who ruled around the end of the New Kingdom and the start of the Third Intermediate Period. In his 19th year he began to count anew, with year 1 of the Whm Mswt perhaps identical to, but at least partly overlapping with his 19th regnal year, as can be seen from the headings of two lists of thieves, known as the Abbott Dockets. These read:

- Year 1, first month of inundation, day 2, corresponding to Year 19
- Year 1, second month of inundation, day 24, corresponding to Year 19

For a long time it was unclear where the Whm Mswt should be placed chronologically. Since the reign of Ramesses IX lasted into its 19th year, the Abbott Dockets were sometimes taken as evidence that the era immediately followed his reign and might perhaps even have been identical to (a phase of) the reign of Ramesses X. This seemed to be confirmed by the fact that both the years 16 and 17 of Ramesses IX and the first two years of the Whm Mswt saw a series of court sessions connected with tomb-robbery. It was Jaroslav Černý who convincingly showed that the era started in year 19 of Ramesses XI. Although generally accepted, as a side effect his solution created an interval of over two decades between the two series of tomb-robbery trials, which created some anomalies for the tomb-robbery papyri.

== Starting date ==
It is often (tacitly) assumed that the start of the Whm Mswt coincided with the accession date of Ramses XI, but this is nothing more than a hypothesis. Whereas it now seems beyond doubt that the accession date of Ramses XI (that is, the date on which his regnal year changed) fell on "month 11, day 20", it does not automatically follow that the year change for the Renaissance coincided with this date as well. It is safer to recognize that we simply don't know the precise date on which the Whm Mswt was inaugurated.

== Nature ==
The exact nature of the Whm Mswt is still unknown. It is often believed to mark a final waning of the power of the centralised monarchy, with Ramesses XI still nominally pharaoh, but with Herihor as High Priest of Amun in Thebes and Smendes in Tanis ruling respectively Upper and Lower Egypt. However, this interpretation rests on the theory that the career of the High Priest Herihor preceded that of Piankh, which has been challenged by Jansen-Winkeln. Since his reversal of high priests (he put the pontificate of Piankh before that of Herihor) other models have been proposed. For example the Whm Mswt has been interpreted as marking the restoration of order by Ramses XI following his expulsion of the Viceroy of Kush Pinehesy, after the latter suppressed the Theban High Priest of Amun Amenhotep.

== Sources ==
During the first two years of the era a series of tomb-robbery trials took place. These are well documented due to the survival of several papyri, most notably Pap. B.M. 10052, Pap. Mayer A, Pap. B.M. 10403, Pap. B.M. 10383 and Papyrus Rochester MAG 51.346.1.

Other sources dating from the Whm Mswt are Pap. Ambras (an inventory of stolen papyri, explicitly dated to year 6 of the Whm Mswt); an oracle mentioning the High Priest of Amun Piankh, explicitly dated to year 7 Whm Mswt under Ramesses XI, and the corpus known as the Late Ramesside Letters.

== Length of the era ==
The era was traditionally thought to have ended around its Year 10 (or Year 28 proper of Ramesses XI) when a letter from the corpus of Late Ramesside Letters shows that the High Priest Piankh was campaigning in Nubia. A graffito in Upper Egypt dates the return of Piankh to Thebes to the third month of Shemu day 23, i.e. 3 days after the start of Ramesses XI's 29th regnal year, which would (on the assumption that the years of the Whm Mswt fully coincided with the original regnal years of Ramesses XI) prove that the Whm Mswt reached into a year 11.

In 2007, Professor Kenneth A. Kitchen argued that the combination of Late Ramesside Letter 41 (undated) with a reference to a Year 12 in West Theban graffito No.1393 (which mentioned the necropolis scribe Ankhefenamun visiting the mountains with the senior scribe Butehamun, Dhutmose's son) likely shows that the Whm Mswt reached a Year 12 or Year 30 proper of Ramesses XI. However, Kitchen's own standard book on the Third Intermediate Period previously attributed the anonymous West Theban graffito No.1393 to the reign of king Smendes and not to the Whm Mswt period. Attributing this date to the Whm Mswt would create enormous problems for his own reconstruction of Egyptian history since West Theban graffito No.1393 forms part of a whole corpus of sources which Kitchen would never be willing to ascribe to the Whm Mswt since this would upset his whole chronology for the period.

It has been proposed by Ad Thijs, followed by Aidan Dodson, that the era may have lasted into its year 15. This theory requires the reascription of papyri normally ascribed to the phase of the reign of Ramesses XI predating the Whm Mswt to the Whm Mswt itself. This move is based on [1] the promotion of several individuals mentioned in those papyri. and [2] the identification of several tomb robbery papyri from the reign of Ramesses XI with documents listed in P. Ambras, a papyrus which stems from year 6 of the Whm Mswt: In year 6 of the Whm Mswt two jars of papyri which apparently had been stolen earlier, probably during the suppression of the High Priest of Amun Amenhotep (see above), were bought back from the people. The Egyptologist T. Eric Peet had already noted that several well-known papyri matched the description given in P. Ambras. However, he also noted that with two papyri, P. BM 10053 and P. BM 10068, the additional entries on the verso (stemming from a year 9 and a year 12) were apparently omitted by the scribe of P. Ambras, which suggests that they were not yet there when the inventory of P. Ambras was composed. From this it could be deduced that the Whm Mswt must have lasted at least into a year 12.

In the Hypostyle Hall of the Temple of Khonsu, there are ample depictions of Herihor as High Priest of Amun, serving under Ramesses XI. It has been pointed out that, on the theory of Jansen-Winkeln which has Herihor following Piankh, this suggests that Ramesses XI must have continued to reign at least for several years after the last attestation of Piankh in year 10 or 11.

== Bibliography ==
- Jürgen von Beckerath, Zur Datierung des Grabräuberpapyrus Brit.Mus 10054, GM 159 (1997), 5-9
- Ogden Goelet, A new 'robbery' papyrus: Rochester MAG 51.346.1, JEA 82 (1996), 107-127
- Jac. J. Janssen, A New Kingdom Settlement, the Verso of Pap. BM 10068, Altorientalische Forschungen 19 (1992), 8-23.
- Kenneth A. Kitchen, "The Third Intermediate Period in Egypt: An Overview of Fact and Fiction" in The Libyan Period in Egypt, Historical Studies into the 21st-24th Dynasties:Proceedings of a Conference at Leiden University, 25–27 October 2007, G.P.F. Broekman, R.J. Demarée and O.E. Kaper, (eds), Nederlands Instituut Voor Het Nabije Oosten, Leuven: Peeters, 2009, 192-195
- Charles F. Nims, an oracle dated in “the Repeating of Births”, JNES 7 (1948), 157-162
- Andrzej Niwiński, Bürgerkrieg, militärischer Staatsstreich und Ausnahmezustand in Ägypten unter Ramses XI, Ein Versuch neuer Interpretation der alten Quellen, in: Gamer-Wallert, Helck (eds.), Gegengabe, (Fs Emma Brunner-Traut), Tübingen, 1992, 235-262
- Andrzej Niwiński, Les périodes WHM MSWT dans l’histoire de l’Égypte: un essai comparatif, BSFÉ 136 (1996), 5-26
- T. Eric Peet, The chronological problems of the Twentieth Dynasty, JEA 14 (1928), 52-73
- T. Eric Peet, The Great Tomb-robberies of the Twentieth Egyptian Dynasty, Oxford, 1930
- Ad Thijs, Reconsidering the End of the Twentieth Dynasty Part V, P. Ambras as an advocate of a shorter chronology, GM 179 (2000), 69-83
- Ad Thijs, Once More, the Length of the Ramesside Renaissance, GM 240 (2014), 69-81
- Ad Thijs, "Some observations on the Tomb-Robbery Papyri", in: A.I. Blöbaum, M. Eaton-Krauss, A. Wüthrich (eds), Pérégrinations avec Erhart Graefe, Festschrift zu seinem 75. Geburtstag (Ägypten und Altes Testament 87), 519-536
- Jean Winand, À propos du P. Ambras, CdÉ 86 (2011), 32-40
- Joachim Friedrich Quack, Eine Revision im Tempel von Karnak (Neuanalyse von Papyrus Rochester MAG 51.346.1), SAK 28 (2000), 219-232
