= Alessandra Nibbi =

Italian archaeologist and egyptologist

- Born: 30 June 1923; Porto San Giorgio, Italy
- Died: 15 January 2007 (aged 83); Oxford, England
- Occupation: Egyptology
- Known for: Ancient Egyptians' seafaring skill, Discussions in Egyptology

Alessandra Nibbi (30 June 1923 – 15 January 2007) was an Italian-born Australian archaeologist.

== Biography ==
Born on 30 June 1923 in Porto San Giorgio, Italy, in 1928 she migrated with her family to Australia because of the political situation in Italy; Nibbi grew up in Melbourne with an English education.
In 1947, after the war and the fall of fascism, Nibbi and her family temporarily returned to Italy, and here she got married. In 1963 she came again to Italy and during the journey she joined an excursion in Egypt, where she became fascinated by ancient Egyptian civilization at the point that once in Italy she started to study archaeology at the University of Perugia and later graduated at the University of Florence. Shortly after, Nibbi left Italy for Oxford, England. In 1969 she published the Etruscans-themed The Tyrrhenians, but a certain notoriety only came in 1972 with the self-published The Sea–Peoples: A Re-examination of the Egyptian Sources, in which she suggested that "the Great Green" mentioned in Egyptian records should not be identified with the Mediterranean Sea as usually done but rather with the verdant Nile Delta, and that ancient Egyptians were not as much a seafaring civilization as thought; at the time the book and the conclusions within were widely panned by mainstream academics.
Since the journals started to refuse publishing her works, in 1985 Nibbi founded her own review, the now-discontinued Discussions in Egyptology, on which she published her successive studies on ancient Egyptian geography centering on her reinterpretation of some narratives involving seafaring, such as the Story of Wenamun. In order to finding evidences for her claims, Nibbi excavated in various Egyptian coastal locations such as Mersa Matruh looking for anchors and other ancient naval technology.

Alessandra Nibbi died on 15 January 2007 in Oxford, aged 83.

== Selected works ==
- Nibbi, Alessandra (1969). The Tyrrhenians. Cowley: Church Army Press.
- Nibbi, Alessandra (1972). The Sea–Peoples: a Re-examination of the Egyptian Sources. Oxford.
- Nibbi, Alessandra (1975). The Sea Peoples and Egypt. Oxford: Noyes Publications. ISBN 978-0815550419.
- Nibbi, Alessandra (1985). Wenamun and Alashiya reconsidered. Oxford: DE publications. ISBN 978-0951070413.
- Nibbi, Alessandra (1985). Ancient Byblos reconsidered. Oxford: DE publications.
