= Pinehesy =

- Viceroy of Kush
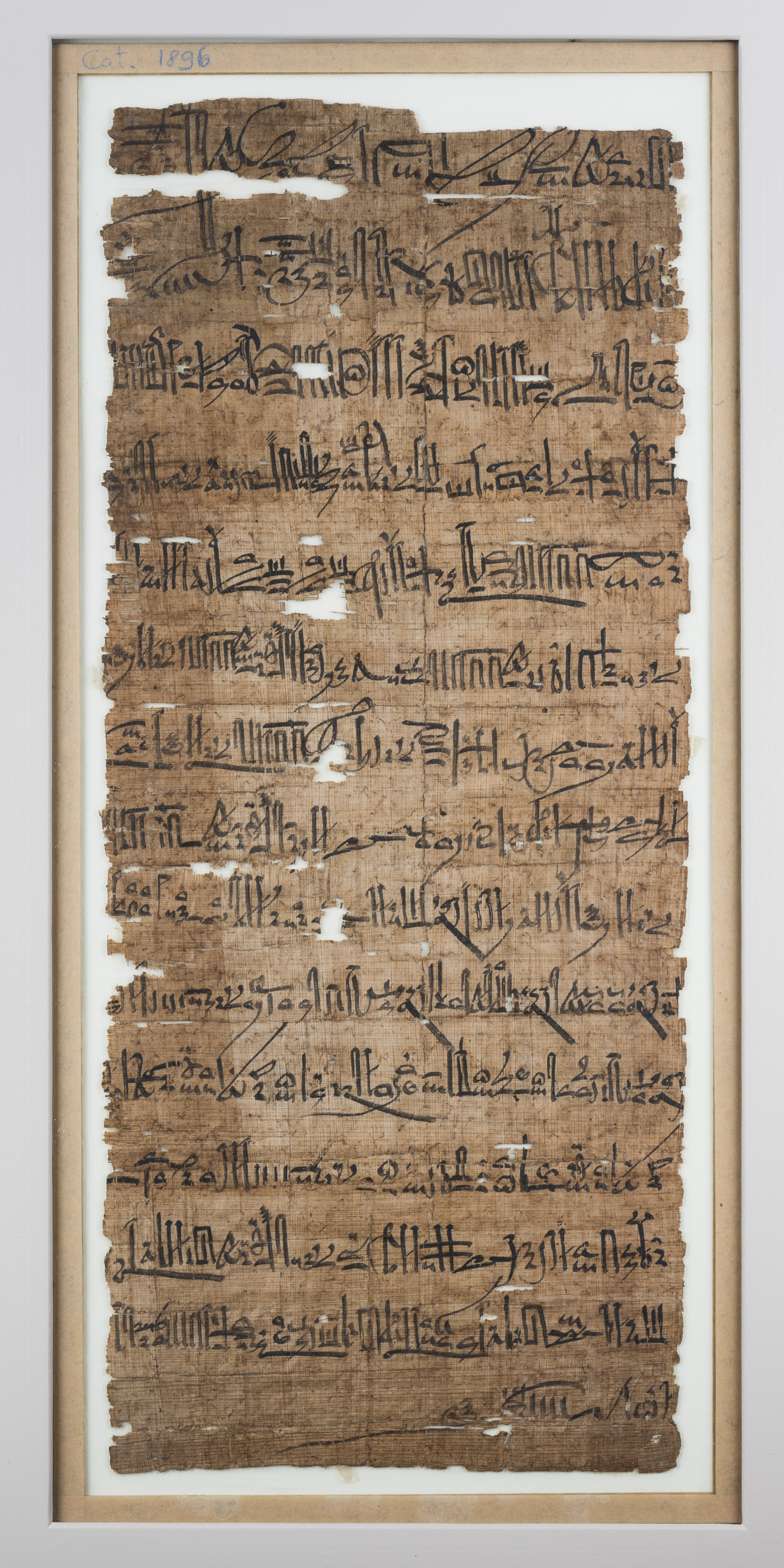
- A decree of pharaoh Ramesses XI addressed to Pinehesy. Turin, Museo Egizio
- Successor: Piankh
- Dynasty: 20th Dynasty
- Pharaoh: Ramesses XI

Pinehesy, Panehesy or Panehasy, depending on the transliteration, was Viceroy of Kush during the reign of Ramesses XI, the last king of the Egyptian 20th Dynasty.

== The sources ==
He is named in the following dated sources:

1. his name appears in the very damaged first lines on the verso of Pap. B.M. 10053, dated to an anonymous year 9, which stems from the reign of Ramesses XI, but might be ascribed either to his actual "year 9" or alternatively to "year 9 of the Whm Mswt". This mention has often been taken as evidence that he was in office at the time and took part in the court case which is described there. However, it has been pointed out that that is an over interpretation of the evidence: there is no title remaining and the context present is too damaged to ascertain how the name functioned in the text.
2. in the Turin Taxation Papyrus, stemming from a year 12 of Ramesses XI (again, either the actual "year 12" or "year 12 of the Whm Mswt"), he is mentioned as Viceroy of Kush. It is clear from the source that he was in office at the time.
3. in year 17 of Rameses XI he is mentioned in his capacity as Viceroy of Kush in a letter the king wrote to him (see the picture heading this article).
4. in sources from the first two years of the Whm Mswt (roughly equaling year 19 and 20 of Ramses XI) he is described as "a public enemy and someone far away, belonging to the past". These sources are: Pap. Mayer A 13, B3; Pap. B.M. 10052, 10,18; Pap. B.M. 10383, 2,5.
5. in Late Ramesside Letter no.28 (Pap. B.M. 10375) from a year 10 (safely ascribable to the Whm Mswt) it is mentioned that the general and High Priest Piankh is about to "go to Pinehesy".

== Action against the High Priest Amenhotep ==
Sometime during the reign of Ramesses XI, Pinehesy succeeded in temporarily removing the Theban High Priest of Amun, Amenhotep from office. This action is often referred to as "the war against the High Priest" or "the suppression of the High Priest Amenhotep". However, in a very detailed study, Kim Ridealgh has shown that the traditional translation "suppression" of the Egyptian term "thj" is misleading, since it suggests that Amenhotep was somehow besieged and/or robbed of his freedom. The term rather denotes a more general act of aggression. Therefore, a more neutral translation like "transgression against the High Priest" is to be preferred.

Although this "transgression against the High Priest of Amun" used to be dated quite early in the reign (prior to year 9 of the reign, on the basis of Pap. B.M. 10053), recently the communis opinio has changed to the view that it took place only shortly before the start of the Whm Mswt or Renaissance, an era which was inaugurated in regnal Year 19, probably to stress the return of normal conditions following the coup of Pinehesy.

== Pinehesy and Piankh ==
Following his "transgression", Pinehesy was chased out of the Thebais, although it is not entirely clear who ended this anarchic period. It seems that Pinehesy more or less maintained his position in Nubia for over a decade.

Some ten years after the suppression, in year 10 of the Whm Mswt, the then High Priest of Amun Piankh, in his position as Viceroy of Kush, led an army into Nubia with the apparent aim to 'meet' a certain Pinehesy, probably the former Viceroy of Kush. Although it is often postulated that it was the aim of this expedition to attack Pinehesy, this is by no means certain. The verb used has the more general meaning "to go to" rather than "attack". The negative determinative which was used in the Tomb Robbery Papyri to designate him as an enemy is absent. Other Egyptologists have suggested that Piankh may have rather gone south to negotiate with Pinehesy, either officially or not. The sources are actually ambiguous on this point and the political climate may well have changed over the years. There is some evidence that at this time Piankh may no longer have been a loyal servant of Ramesses XI, which allows for the possibility that he was secretly negotiating with Pinehesy, possibly even plotting against the reigning king.

E. Wente wrote: "One has the impression that the viceroy and his Nubian troops were loyalists, for the remarks made by his opponent Piankh in letter No. 301 are quite disparaging of the pharaoh, Ramesses XI." In this letter, better known as LRL no. 21, Piankh remarks:

As for Pharaoh, l.p.h., how shall he reach this land? And of whom is Pharaoh, l.p.h., superior still?

Unfortunately, due to the very limited nature of the sources, the exact relationships between the three main protagonists, Piankh, Pinehesy and Ramesses XI remain far from clear. Some scholars believe that the Nubian campaign was part of an ongoing power struggle between the High Priest of Amun and the Viceroy of Kush. However, it is equally possible that Piankh came to the rescue of Pinehesy against some common enemy. In fact, neither the aim of the expedition nor its outcome are beyond doubt.

It seems that Pinehesy died of old age while still in control of Lower Nubia. He was buried in Aniba, where a tomb inscribed with his name was discovered.

== Bibliography ==
- Jaroslav Černý, Egypt: From the death of Ramesses III to the end of the Twenty-First Dynasty. In I. E. S. Edwards, C. J. Gadd, N. G. L. Hammond, & E. Sollberger (Eds.) Cambridge Ancient History: Volume II Part 2: History of the Middle East and the Aegean region c. 1380-1000 BC (pp. 606–657). New York, NY: Cambridge University Press 1975.
- Hermann Kees, Die Hohenpriester des Amun von Karnak von Herihor bis zum Ende der Äthiopenzeit (1964). Leiden: E. J. Brill
- Lynn Meskell, Private Life in New Kingdom Egypt, Princeton University Press 2002
- Morales, A. J. (2001). The suppression of the high priest Amenhotep: A suggestion to the role of Panhesi. Göttinger Miszellen, 181, 59-76.
- A.J. Peden, Egyptian Historical Inscriptions of the Twentieth Dynasty, 1994, 112-114.
- Kim Ridealgh, A Tale of Suppressions and Semantics: Reinterpreting Papyrus Mayer A and the So-called 'War of the High Priest' during the Reign of Ramesses XI, SAK 43 (2014), 359-373.
- László Török, The Kingdom of Kush: Handbook of the Napatan-Meroitic Civilization, Brill Academic Publishers 1997
