= El Hiba =

Archaeological site in Beni Suef governorate, Egypt

El Hiba الحيبة al-Ḥībah
- Location in Egypt
- Coordinates: 28°46′25″N 30°55′22″E
- Country: Egypt
- Governorate: Beni Suef
- Time zone: UTC+2 (EET)
  - Summer (DST): UTC+3 (EEST)

t A i i w DA i i t niwt
Tayu-djayet
in hieroglyphs

El Hiba (alt. el-Hibeh; Arabic الحيبة al-Ḥībah) is the modern name of the ancient Egyptian city of Tayu-djayet (t3yw-ḏ3yt), an ancient nickname meaning "their walls" in reference to the massive enclosure walls built on the site. In Coptic, it was known as ⲧⲉⲩϫⲟ Teujo. During the Graeco-Roman period it was called Ancyron polis (Ancient Greek: Ἀγκυρῶν πόλις) and Ancyronpolis, meaning anchor city, and it took its name from the manufacture of stone anchors cut from the neighboring quarries. In antiquity, the city was located in the 18th Upper Egyptian nome, and today it is found in the Bani Suwayf governorate.

== History ==
From the late 20th Dynasty to the 22nd Dynasty, Tayu-djayet was a frontier town, marking the division of the country between the High Priests of Amun at Thebes and the kings of Egypt at Tanis. A massive enclosure wall was built at the site, with bricks stamped with the names of the High Priests Pinedjem I and Menkheperre. Earlier, the High Priest Herihor also lived and operated from al-Hibah. During the 22nd Dynasty, king Shoshenq I built a temple dedicated to "Amun-Great-of-Roarings" at the site, complete with a topographical list of cities captured during his "First Campaign of Victory" in Palestine; the temple is also decorated by his son, Osorkon I. The ancient settlement is at 28°47′14″N 30°55′16″E a little to the North of the modern town.

== Today ==
Since 2001, El Hibeh has been the focus of ongoing excavations by a team of U.C. Berkeley archaeologists. However, due to instability as a result of the 2011 Egyptian Revolution, looters have been allowed to systematically plunder the site, digging hundreds of pits, exposing tombs, destroying walls, and leaving human remains strewn about the grounds.

== See also ==
- List of ancient Egyptian towns and cities
- Media related to Ankyronpolis at Wikimedia Commons
