= Piankh =

Egyptian high priest of Amun

- High Priest of Amun
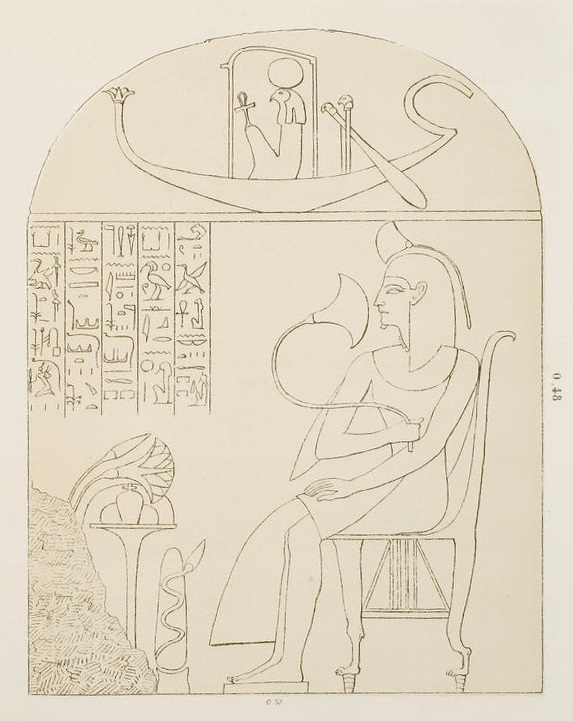
- Funerary stele of Piankh, drawn by Auguste Mariette.
- Tenure: 1074–1070 BC
- Predecessor: Amenhotep
- Successor: Herihor or Pinedjem I
- Spouse: Hrere or Nodjmet
- Children: Pinedjem I, Hekanefer, Hekamaat, Ankhefenmut, Faienmut

Piankh or Payankh was a High Priest of Amun during the 21st Dynasty. Piankh has been assumed to be a son of Herihor and the heir to the Theban office, however recent studies have shown that Piankh was actually Herihor's Predecessor. Piankh also held positions as the King's scribe, King's son of Kush, Overseer of the granaries, and commander of the archers of Upper Egypt. Piankh in his position as Viceroy of Kush, would lead an army into Nubia where he would confront a Pinehesy of the former Viceroy of Kush. There is a debate because Piankh would have been living in Nubia, if he wanted to meet them in battle or secretly negotiate with Pinehesy. Piankh may have not been a loyal servant of Ramesses XI because of the negotiations that were taking place between Piankh and Pinhesy. While it is not known as to what Piankh's motivations were he would reunify the viceroyalty and the High priesthood in Kush after defeating Pinehesy. However, this reunification would only last until his death when Pinehesy would take back his position of power.

Piankh in his campaigns against Pinhesy, Piankh would finance his campaign through the sacking of Necropolis. Sacking of Necropolis would become a policy viceroyalty made by Piankh that would be continued under the priesthood after his death.

== Background ==
While the High Priest of Amun Piankh (or Payankh) has been assumed to be a son-in-law of Herihor and his heir to the Theban office of the High Priest of Amun, recent studies by Karl Jansen-Winkeln of the surviving temple inscriptions and monumental works by Herihor and Piankh in Upper Egypt imply that Piankh was actually Herihor's predecessor.

Piankh held a number of official positions including High Priest of Amun, King's scribe, King's son of Kush, Overseer of the foreign countries to the South, overseer of the granaries and commander of the archers of the whole of [Upper] Egypt. He was succeeded in office by either Herihor or his son Pinedjem.

== Family ==
The identity of Piankh's wife has not been established beyond doubt. In the Temple of Luxor there is a graffito of which only rudimentary traces of the beginning of her name have survived. These have been interpreted as either an "h" (Gardiner's Sign List V28, supporting Hrere) or as "ndjm" (Gardiner's Sign List M29). The latter solution would favour a model in which Piankh was married to a lady Nodjmet. Recently it has been argued that there were actually two ladies called Nodjmet: the first one, Nodjmet A, the wife of Piankh and mother of Herihor; the second one, Nodjmet B, the wife of Herihor. Whereas the identity of his wife remains uncertain, it is beyond doubt that he had a son called Pinedjem.

== Military activity ==
The region marked as Kush, was the part of land the Piankh was fighting for against Pinehesy

In year 10 of the Whm Mswt Piankh, in his position as Viceroy of Kush, led an army into Nubia with the apparent aim to 'meet' a certain Pinehesy, probably the former Viceroy of Kush. Some ten years earlier, just before the start of the Whm mswt, Pinehesy had been chased out of the Thebaid, following his role in suppressing the High Priest of Amun Amenhotep. It is believed that since then he lived in Nubia as an enemy of the state. Although it is often postulated that it was the aim of this expedition to fight Pinehesy, this is by no means certain.

The sources are actually ambiguous on this point and the political climate may well have changed over the years. There is some evidence that at this time Piankh may no longer have been a loyal servant of Ramesses XI, which allows for the possibility that he was secretly negotiating with Pinehesy, possibly even plotting against the reigning king.

E. Wente wrote: "One has the impression that the viceroy and his Nubian troops were loyalists, for the remarks made by his opponent Piankh in letter No. 301 are quite disparaging of the pharaoh, Ramesses XI." In this letter, better known as LRL no. 21, Piankh remarks:

As for Pharaoh, l.p.h., how shall he reach this land? And of whom is Pharaoh, l.p.h., superior still?

In the same letter and two others (LRL no. 34 and no. 35) Piankh gives the order to the Scribe of the Necropolis Tjaroy (=Dhutmose), Nodjmet and a certain Payshuuben to secretly arrest and question two Medjay policemen about certain things they had apparently said:

If they find out that (it is) true, you shall place them (in) two baskets and (they) shall be thrown (into) this water by night. But do not let anybody in the land find out.

It has been argued that, given Piankh's prominent position at the time, the secrecy can only have concerned the king. If this is correct, it follows that the political situation of the time must have been very complex. Unfortunately, due to the very limited nature of the sources, the exact relationships between the three main protagonists, Piankh, Pinehesy and Ramesses XI remain far from clear. Some scholars believe that the Nubian campaign was part of an ongoing power struggle between the High Priest of Amun and the Viceroy of Kush. However, it is equally possible that Piankh came to the rescue of Pinehesy against some common enemy. The verb often translated as "to attack" only means "to meet/ to go to". In fact, neither the aim of the expedition nor its outcome are beyond doubt.

While there is still debate about whether or not Piankh was working or at war with Pinehesy, Piankh's war would bring Pinehesy career to an end. While Piankh would combine Pinehesy's viceroyalty and high priesthood, after defeating Pinehesy, Piankhs death would lead to the re-separation of the viceroyalty in Nubia.

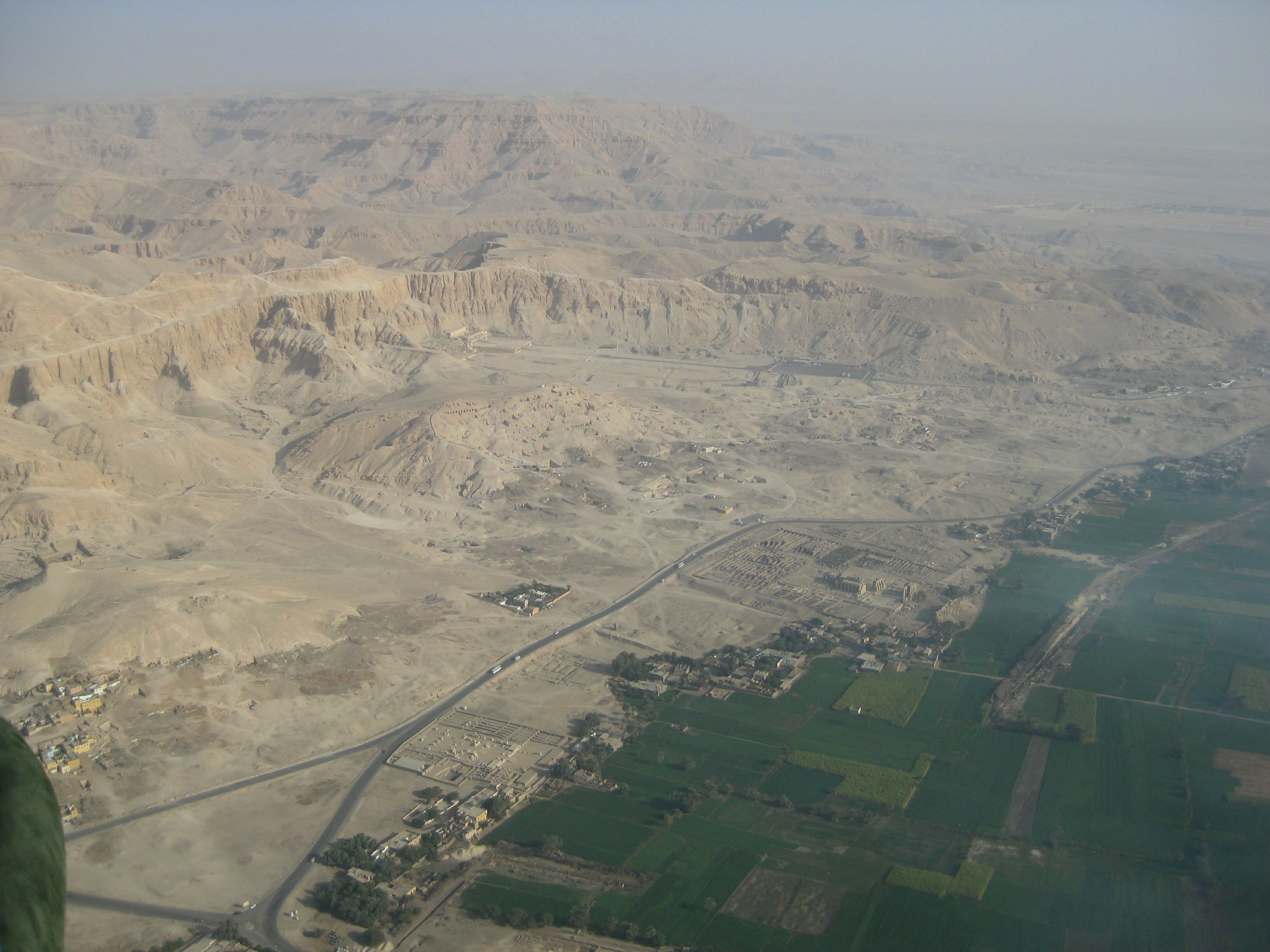
Necropolis that Piankh would have sacked for treasure

== Piankh and Sacking of Necropolis ==
To finance his military campaigns, Piankh put in place a policy of locating old tombs to sack their treasures. The priests of Amun scoured the Valley of Kings and the Theban hills to find tombs, which were stripped of valuables, rewrapped and placed in group graves (caches). This policy was continued under the priesthoods of Herihor and Pinedjem I.
