= High Priest of Amun =

Priestly title in ancient Egypt

The god Amun.

R8 U36 T8 n i mn n N5
High Priest of Amun
ḥm nṯr tpj n jmn
in hieroglyphs
Era: New Kingdom
(1550–1069 BC)

The High Priest of Amun or First Prophet of Amun (ḥm nṯr tpj n jmn) was the highest-ranking priest in the priesthood of the ancient Egyptian god Amun. The first high priests of Amun appear in the New Kingdom of Egypt, at the beginning of the Eighteenth Dynasty.

== History ==
The priesthood of Amun rose in power during the early Eighteenth dynasty through significant tributes to the god Amun by rulers such as Hatshepsut and more importantly Thutmose III. The Amun priesthood in Thebes had four high-ranking priests:

- The Chief Prophet of Amun at Karnak (ḥm nṯr tpj n jmn), also referred to as the Chief Priest of Amun.
- The Second Prophet of Amun at Karnak (ḥm nṯr snnw n jmn), also referred to as the Second Priest of Amun.
- The Third Prophet of Amun at Karnak (ḥm nṯr ḫmtnw n jmn khemet-nu), also referred to as the Third Priest of Amun.
- The Fourth Prophet of Amun at Karnak (ḥm nṯr jfdw n jmn), also referred to as the Fourth Priest of Amun.

The power of the Amun priesthood was temporarily curtailed during the Amarna Period. A high priest named Maya is recorded in year 4 of Akhenaten. Akhenaten had the name of Amun removed from monuments during his reign as well as the names of several other deities. After his death, Amun was restored to his place of prominence among the cults in Egypt. The young pharaoh Tutankhaten changed his name to Tutankhamun to signal the restoration of Amun to his former place of prominence.

The Theban High Priest of Amun was appointed by the King. It was not uncommon for the position to be held by dignitaries who held additional posts in the pharaoh's administration. Several of the high priests from the time of Ramesses II also served as Vizier.

At the end of the New Kingdom, the Twentieth Dynasty priesthood of Amun is for a large part dominated by Ramessesnakht. His son, Amenhotep, eventually succeeded his father and found himself in conflict with the Viceroy of Kush, Pinehesy. Pinehesy took his troops north and besieged Thebes. After this period, generals by the name of Herihor and Piankh served as High Priest.

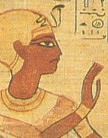
Herihor

By the time Herihor was proclaimed as the first ruling High Priest of Amun in 1080 BC—in the 19th Year of Ramesses XI—the Amun priesthood exercised an effective stranglehold on Egypt's economy. The Amun priests owned two-thirds of all the temple lands in Egypt and 90 percent of her ships plus many other resources. Consequently, the Amun priests were as powerful as the pharaoh, if not more so. The High Priests of Amun were of such power and influence that they were effectively the rulers of Upper Egypt from 1080 to c. 943 BC, after which their influence declined. They are however not regarded as a ruling dynasty with pharaonic prerogatives, and after this period the influence of the Amun priesthood declined. One of the sons of the High Priest Pinedjem I would eventually assume the throne and rule Egypt for almost half a century as pharaoh Psusennes I, while the Theban High Priest Psusennes III would take the throne as king Psusennes II, the final ruler of the Twenty-first Dynasty of Egypt.

== List of high priests ==
Senenu, High Priest of Amūn at Deir El-Baḥri, grinding grain, c. 1352–1292 B.C. (to the end of the 18th Dynasty), Limestone, Brooklyn Museum.

=== New Kingdom (18th, 19th and 20th Dynasties) ===
High Priest of Amun
| High Priests | Pharaoh | Dynasty |
|---|---|---|
| Djehuty | Ahmose I | 18th Dynasty |
| Minmontu | Ahmose I | 18th Dynasty |
| Hapuseneb | Hatshepsut | 18th Dynasty |
| Menkheperraseneb I | Thutmose III | 18th Dynasty |
| Menkheperreseneb II | Thutmose III | 18th Dynasty |
| Amenemhat | Amenhotep II | 18th Dynasty |
| Mery | Amenhotep II | 18th Dynasty |
| Ptahmose | Amenhotep III | 18th Dynasty |
| Meryptah | Amenhotep III | 18th Dynasty |
| Maya | Akhenaten | 18th Dynasty |
| Parennefer-Wennefer | Tutankhamun | 18th Dynasty |
| Parennefer-Wennefer | Ay | 18th Dynasty |
| Parennefer-Wennefer | Horemheb | 18th Dynasty |
| Nebneteru Tenry | Seti I | 19th Dynasty |
| Nebwenenef | Ramesses II | 19th Dynasty |
| Hori | Ramesses II | 19th Dynasty |
| Paser | Ramesses II | 19th Dynasty |
| Bakenkhonsu | Ramesses II | 19th Dynasty |
| Roma-Rui | Ramesses II | 19th Dynasty |
| Roma-Rui | Merneptah | 19th Dynasty |
| Roma-Rui | Seti II | 19th Dynasty |
| Bakenkhons II | Sethnakht | 20th Dynasty |
| Bakenkhons II | Ramesses III | 20th Dynasty |
| Ramessesnakht | Ramesses IV – Ramesses IX | 20th Dynasty |
| Amenhotep | Ramses IX – XI | 20th Dynasty |

=== Third Intermediate Period ===
==== 21st Dynasty ====
Though not officially pharaohs, the High Priests of Amun at Thebes were the de facto rulers of Upper Egypt during the Twenty-first dynasty, writing their names in cartouches and being buried in royal tombs.

| Name | Portrait | Comments | Dates |
|---|---|---|---|
| Herihor | | First High Priest of Amun to claim to be pharaoh. He ruled in the south in Thebes, while Ramesses XI ruled from the north in Pi-Ramesses. Some sources suggest he may have reigned after Piankh. | 1080–1074 BC |
| Piankh | | Some sources suggest he may have reigned before Herihor. | 1074–1070 BC |
| Pinedjem I | | Son of Piankh. Father of Psusennes I. | 1070–1032 BC |
| Masaharta | | Son of Pinedjem I. | 1054–1045 BC |
| Djedkhonsuefankh | — | Son of Pinedjem I. | 1046–1045 BC |
| Menkheperre | | Son of Pinedjem I. | 1045–992 BC |
| Nesbanebdjed II (Smendes II) | | Son of Menkheperre. | 992–990 BC |
| Pinedjem II | | Son of Menkheperre, Father of Psusennes II. | 990–976 BC |
| Pasebakhaennuit III (Psusennes III) | — | Possibly the same person as Psusennes II. Either he or Pinedjem II is generally considered to be the last High Priest of Amun to consider himself as a pharaoh-like figure. | 976–943 BC |

==== 22nd Dynasty ====
- Iuput, Son of Shoshenq I high priest of Amun for most of his father's reign, and into the reign of his brother Osorkon I. 944–924 BC.
- Shoshenq C (possibly identical to Shoshenq II), Son of Osorkon I and Maatkare B. Served as high priest of Amun at Karnak for large part of his father's reign.
- Iuwlot, Son of Osorkon I. Probably became high priest of Amun late in the reign of Osorkon I and served until the early years of Takelot I.
- Nesibanebdjedet III (Smendes III), Son of Osorkon I. Served as high priest of Amun during the middle of the reign of his brother Takelot I.
- Harsiese B, Son of Soshenq II. Promoted to high priest of Amun under Osorkon II. 874–860 BC.
- Nimlot C, Son of Osorkon II. Became high priest of Amun after year 16. The name of his predecessor [...du/aw...] was erased. 855–845 BC.
- Takelot F (see Takelot II). Son of Nimlot III. Followed his father as high priest of Amun before probably becoming a Theban King as Takelot II. 845–840 BC.
- Osorkon B (see Osorkon III). Eldest son of Takelot II. Probably became high priest of Amun after his father assumed kingship. 840–785 BC. Later took the throne as Osorkon III.
- Osorkon F, probably son of Rudamun and grandson of Osorkon III?
- Harsiese, son of [...du/aw...] i.e. Pedubast? 835–800 BC.

==== 25th and 26th Dynasties ====
- Haremakhet, Son of Shabaka 704?–660 BC.
- Harkhebi, Son of Haremakhet, Grandson of Shabaka. Served as HPA until at least year 14 of Psamtik I. 660–644 BC.
- 2 unattested HPA or vacant? 644–595 BC.
- Ankhnesneferibre, The God's Wife of Amun also served as High Priest of Amun. 595–c. 560 BC.
- Nitocris II, Daughter of Pharaoh Ahmose (II). c. 560–525 BC.

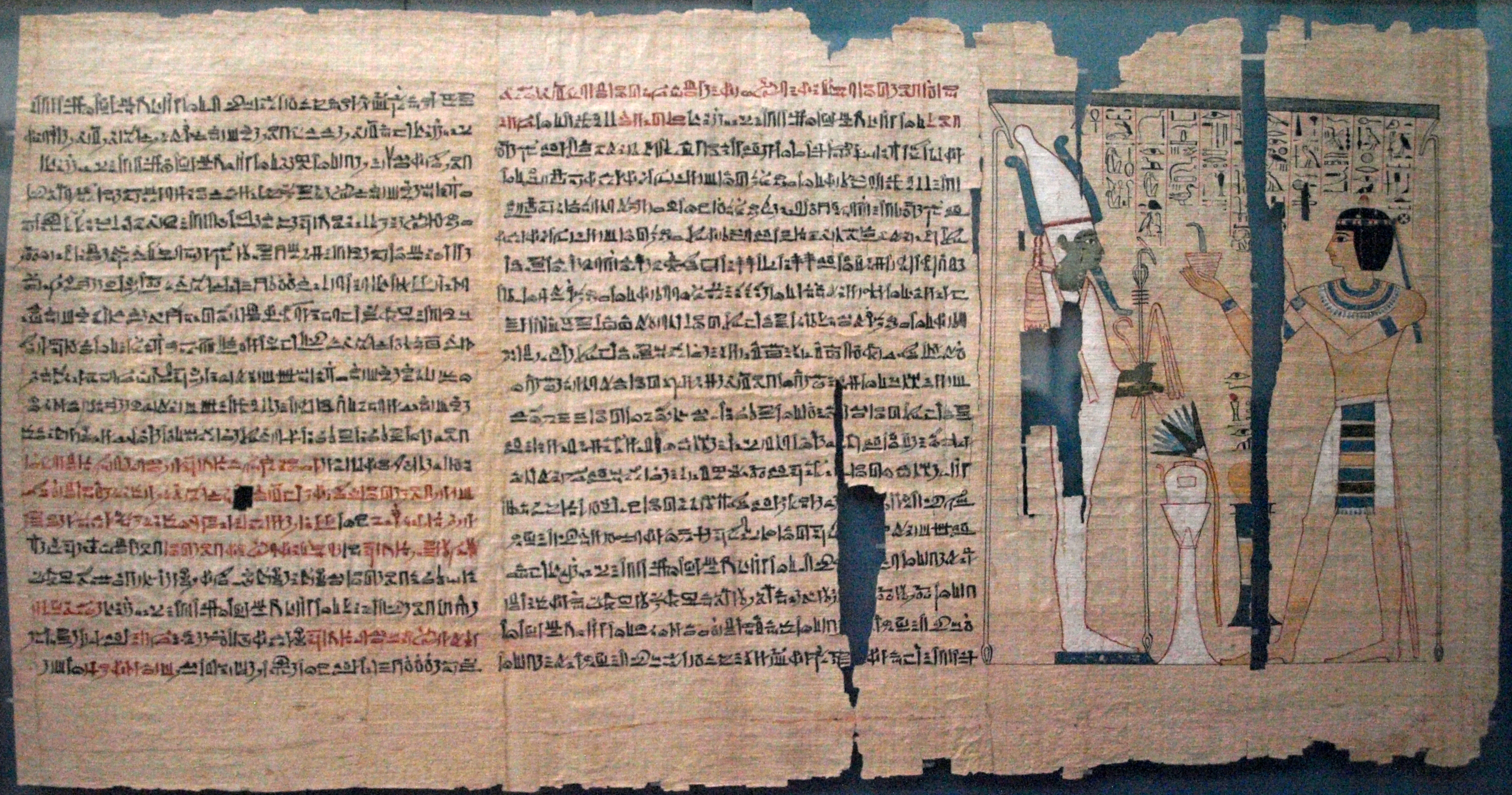
Pinudjem II as High Priest

=== Ending ===
The office continued in existence until 525 BC, when the Persian Empire overthrew Egypt's last Saite ruler, Psamtik III (526–525 BC), and enslaved his sister Nitocris. Thereafter, the powerful office of High Priest of Amun disappears from history. It was not recreated by subsequent dynasties when Egypt regained its independence from Persia.

== High Priest of Amun at Tanis ==
In the northern capital of Tanis, the pharaohs of the Twenty-first dynasty decided to openly emulate Karnak by building and expanding their own temple of Amun-Ra, along with shrines dedicated to the other members of the Theban Triad. There are very few individuals known to have borne the mostly honorific title of High Priest of Amun at Tanis:

- Pharaoh Psusennes I, who probably had deputy Wendjebauendjed
- Pharaoh Amenemope
- Prince Hornakht, son of Osorkon II
- Prince Padebehenbast, son of Shoshenq III
- Prince Shoshenq, son of Pami, possibly the pharaoh-to-be Shoshenq V

== See also ==
- Divine Adoratrice of Amun
- Khonsuemheb and the Ghost – a Ramesside–period story whose protagonist, Khonsuemheb, is a fictitious High Priest of Amun
- List of pharaohs deified during lifetime
