= Psusennes I =

Third pharaoh of the 21st Dynasty of Egypt

- Pasebakhenniut
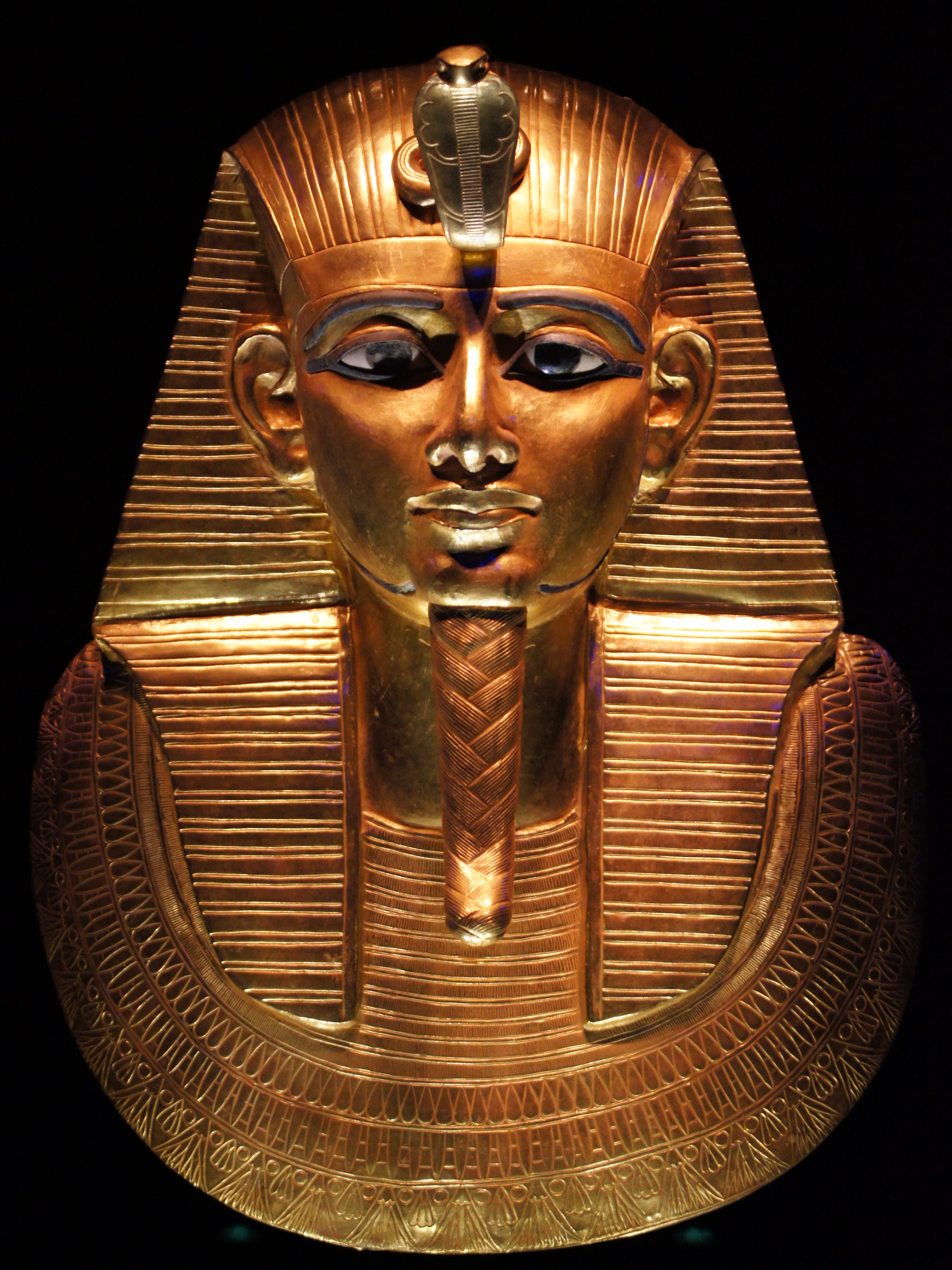
- Gold funerary mask of Psusennes I at the Egyptian Museum in Cairo, Egypt

Pharaoh
- Reign: 1047–998 BC (49 years)
- Predecessor: Amenemnisu
- Successor: Amenemope
Royal titulary
Horus name
Kanakhtemauiamun Userefaw Sekhajemwaset
kꜣ-nḫt-m-ꜣwj-Jmn-wsr-fꜣw-sḫꜥj-m-Wꜣst
Strong bull, embraced by Amun,
full of power, who shines in Thebes
G5	E2 D40 m D37 D37 i mn n wsr f F39 Z7 s N28 D36 m R19 t O49
Nebty name
Wermenu-em-Ipetsut Nebpehti Waftawywahnesitmiraempet
Wr-mnw-m-Jptswt nb-pḥtj-wꜥf-tꜣwj-wꜣḥ-nsjt-mj-Rꜥ-m-pt
Great of monuments
in Ipetsut, powerful Lord, royal protector of
the two lands, like Ra in the sky
G16
G36 r mn n W24 W24 W24 m i p t Q1 Z2s O49 nb F9 F9; G45 f N19 N21 N21 V29 t M23 W19 N5 m p t N1
Golden Horus
Semakheperuder Pedjet-9 Itjiemsekhemef Tawnebu
smꜣ-ḫprw-dr-pḏt-9-jṯj-m-sḫm.f-tꜣw-nbw
Golden Horus who unifies the manifestations,
who overpowers the nine bows (the enemies of Egypt) and
conquers all the lands with its strength
G8	F36 L1 Z2 D46 r D40 T10 t Z1 Z1 Z1 Z1 Z1 Z1 Z1 Z1 Z1 V15 D40 m S42 m&f N17 N17 N17 N21 N21 nb Z7 Z2
Prenomen
Akheperre Setepenamun
ꜥꜣ-ḫpr-Rꜥ-stp.n-Jmn
Great is the manifestation of Ra, the chosen one of Amun
M23 t L2 t < N5 O29 L1 C12 U21 N35 >
Nomen
Pasebakhaenniut Meriamun
pꜣ-sbꜣ-ḫꜥj-n-njwt-mrj-Jmn
Psusennes, lit. The star who appears
in the city [of Thebes], beloved of Amun
G39 N5 < M17 Y5 N35 U7 G40 N14 N28 N35 O49 >
- Consorts: Mutnodjmet, Wiay
- Children: Amenemope, Ankhefenmut, Isetemkheb C
- Father: Pinedjem I
- Mother: Henuttawy
- Died: c. 998 BC
- Burial: NRT III, Tanis
- Monuments: Great Temple of Amun, Tanis (now in ruined fragments)
- Dynasty: 21st Dynasty

Psusennes I (Ancient Egyptian: pꜣ-sbꜣ-ḫꜥ-n-njwt; Greek Ψουσέννης) was the third pharaoh of the 21st Dynasty who ruled from Tanis in the Iron Age IB, between c. 1047 and 998 BC.

Psusennes's tomb, discovered in February 1940 by the French Egyptologist Pierre Montet, is notable for the condition in which it was found. All previously found pharaonic tombs had been graverobbed, including the tomb of Tutankhamun, and Psusennes's tomb has been the only ancient Egyptian royal tomb discovered in fully intact condition. However, the humid climate of Lower Egypt caused only the metal objects to survive. Pharaoh Amenemope and General Wendjebauendjed were also buried within Psusennes I's NRT III Tanis tomb while Pharaoh Shoshenq II and two anonymous royal individuals (possibly Siamun and Psusennes II) were reburied in Psusennes I's tomb after their original tombs became inundated with water.

== Name ==
Psusennes is the Greek version of his original name Pasibkhanu or Pasebakhaenniut (in reconstructed Late Egyptian: /pəsiwʃeʕənneːʔə/), which means "The Star Appearing in the City". His throne name, Akheperre Setepenamun, translates as "Great are the Manifestations of Ra, chosen of Amun."

== Reign ==
=== Reign length ===
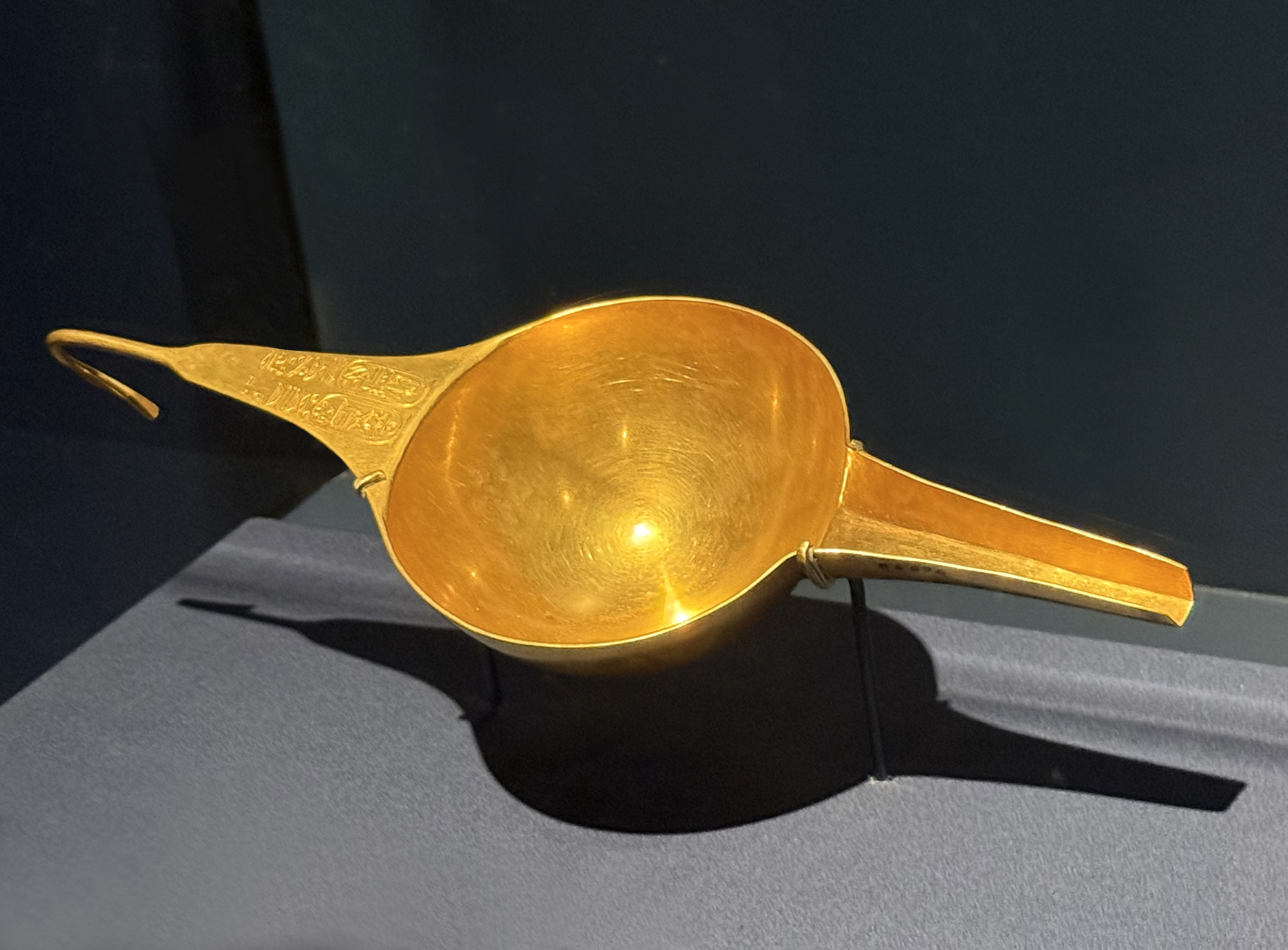
A gold pouring vessel of Psusennes I

The reign length of Psusennes I is not certain. Different copies of Manetho's records credit him with a reign of either 41 or 46 years.

Some Egyptologists have proposed raising the 41 year figure by a decade to 51 years to more closely match certain anonymous Year 48 and Year 49 dates in Upper Egypt. in 1992, the German Egyptologist Karl Jansen-Winkeln suggested that all these dates should be attributed to the serving High Priest of Amun, Menkheperre instead who is explicitly documented in a Year 48 record. Jansen-Winkeln notes that "in the first half of Dyn. 21, [the] HP Herihor, Pinedjem I and Menkheperre have royal attributes and [royal] titles to differing extents" whereas the first three Tanite kings (Smendes, Amenemnisu and Psusennes I) are almost never referred to by name in Upper Egypt with the exception of one graffito and rock stela for Smendes. In contrast, the name of Psusennes I's Twenty-first Dynasty successors such as Amenemope, Osorkon the Elder, and Siamun appear frequently in various documents from Upper Egypt while the Theban High Priest Pinedjem II who was a contemporary of the latter three kings never adopted any royal attributes or titles in his career.

Hence, two separate Year 49 dates from Thebes and Kom Ombo could be attributed to the ruling High Priest Menkheperre in Thebes instead of Psusennes I but this remains uncertain. Psusennes I's reign has been estimated at 46 years by the editors of the Handbook to Ancient Egyptian Chronology. Psusennes I must have enjoyed cordial relations with the serving High Priests of Amun in Thebes during his long reign since the High Priest Smendes II donated several grave goods to this king which were found in Psusennes I's tomb.

However, as the Egyptologist Aidan Dodson notes in his 2012 book Afterglow of Empire: Egypt from the Fall of the New Kingdom to the Saite Renaissance:

"At some point during his long pontificate, [the Theban High Priest of Amun] Menkheperre A acquired – via mechanisms which remains obscure – some royal attributes; a statuette shows him with a high priestly skull-cap, but with a royal kilt and cartouche around his personal name. However, while his name and high priestly title are found enclosed in ovals on various bricks...with a variant first oval at el-Hiba which reads "Dual King (of) Upper Egypt & Lower Egypt", all Menkheperre's monumental attestations give him purely high-priestly titles and no cartouche – and certainly no definitive prenomen. This suggests that the use of such [royal] attributes was brief, perhaps directly following his father's death; as late in his career as Year 48 (see p.48) he was certainly a simple high priest."

Moreover, Menkheperre was the brother of king Psusennes I since both of them were sons of the High priest Pinedjem I. Therefore, the Year 49 anonymous dates in Upper Egypt almost certainly belong to Psusennes I who worked in close cooperation with his brother Menkheperre who never used a royal name or prenomen in his own monuments. The German Egyptologist Thomas Schneider also assigns Psusennes I a highest date of Year 49 in a 2010 paper on the Chronology of the Egyptian New Kingdom and Third Intermediate Period. While Menkheperre certainly ruled Upper Egypt, he granted de facto recognition of Psusennes I's reign from Thebes. The aged Psusennes I could even have reigned into an unattested 50th year.

In Papyrus Brooklyn 16.205, which is dated to Year 4 of an anonymous king and refers back to Year 49 of another king, the latter date must be dated to Psusennes I's reign since only Psusennes I reigned this long. Previously Egyptologists (including Kenneth Kitchen) once speculated in the 1970s that the Year 49 date belonged to the reign of Shoshenq III but this king's highest date was only his Year 39 and it cannot exceed 42 years since his successor, Shoshenq IV ruled Egypt for at least 10 years between the death of Shoshenq III and the accession of Pami...as even Kitchen accepted in the preface to his 1996 book on the Third Intermediate Period. If so, then Year 49 it the highest year attested for Psusennes I.

=== Architecture ===
Psusennes I is best known for a major feat of engineering, moving the city of Pi-Ramesse to Zaon (Greek: Tanis).

During the LBA/IA transition (3.2 ka event, Collapse of the LBA; early 20th dynasty) and Iron IA/IB transition (late 20th Dynasty), the city of Pi-Ramesses on the Pelusiac branch of the Nile suffered from climate change as the river had been subject to drought and silted up. This made river transport to the city difficult. At the height of Iron Age IB, Psusennes I thus moved Pi-Ramesses to his new capital at Zaon (Tanis), located on the Tanitic branch of the Nile.

==== New Capital Zaon (Tanis) ====
Psusennes was ostensibly the ruler responsible for turning Tanis into a fully-fledged capital city, surrounding its temple with a formidable brick temenos wall with its sanctuary dedicated to Amun being composed of blocks salvaged from the derelict Pi-Ramesses. Many of these blocks were unaltered and kept the name of Pi-Ramesses' builder, Ramesses II, including obelisks still bearing the name of Ramesses II transported from the former capital of Pi-Ramesses to Tanis.

==== Great Temple of Amun ====
At Tanis, Psusennes I built the enclosure walls and the central part of the Great Temple at Tanis which was dedicated to the triad of Amun, Mut and Khonsu. The temple was completed by Siamun.

== Family ==
=== Parentage and siblings ===
Psusennes I was the son of Pinedjem I and Duathathor-Henuttawy, Ramesses XI's daughter by Tentamun. Thus, he was the maternal grandson of Ramesses XI of the 20th Dynasty through his mother.

- Menkheperre, brother of Psusennes I, High Priest of Thebes.
- Mutnedjmet, sister of Psusennes I and became his wife.

=== Marriages and children ===
- Psusennes I married his sister Mutnedjmet.
- Psusennes I married Wiay.

Only two of Psusennes I's children remain identifiable.

- Amenemope, may be the son of Psusennes I(?) and born to Mutnedjmet(?). He became the successor of Psusennes I.
- Ankhefenmut C, was the son of Psusennes I and born to Mutnedjmet. He was buried in the tomb of his father, but his name and titles had been erased indicating he fell from grace.
- Isetemkheb C, was the daughter of Psusennes I and Wiay. She married Menkheperre and became the First Chief of the Harem of Amun-Ra.
- Henuttawy(?) was the daughter of Psusennes I (uncertain).

== Burial ==
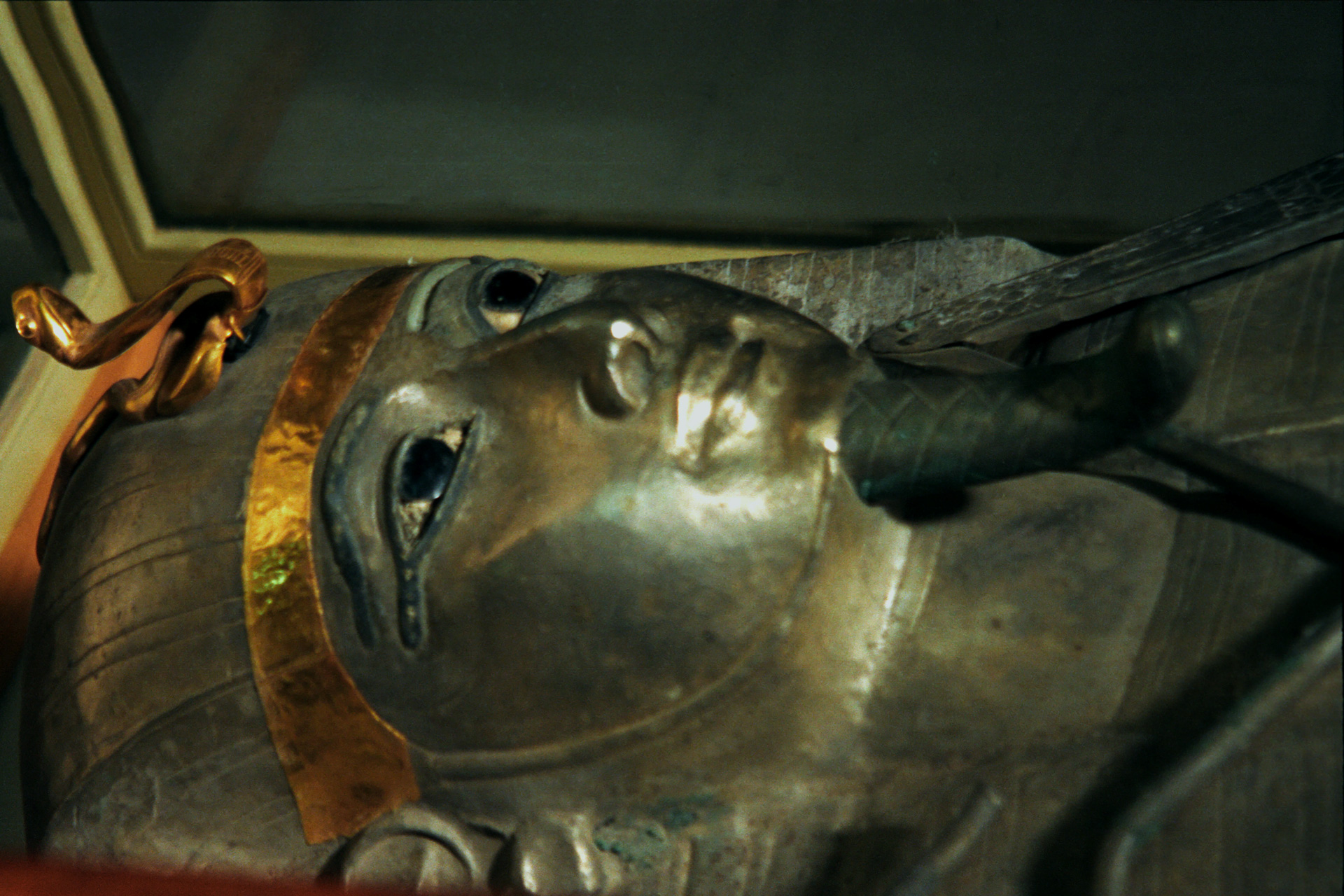
Silver anthropoid coffin of Psusennes I, Cairo Museum

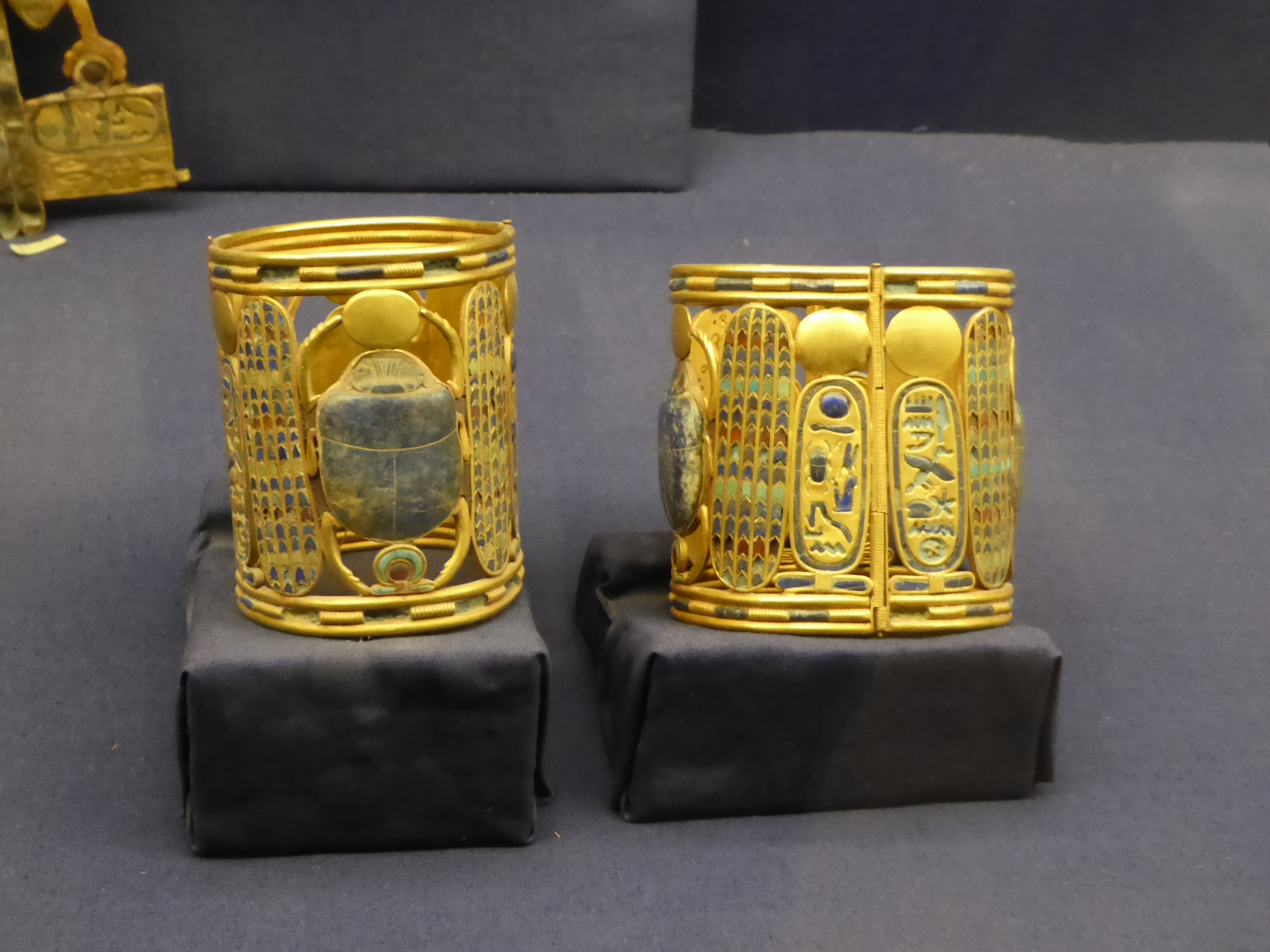
Psusennes I's scarab designed armband, Cairo Museum

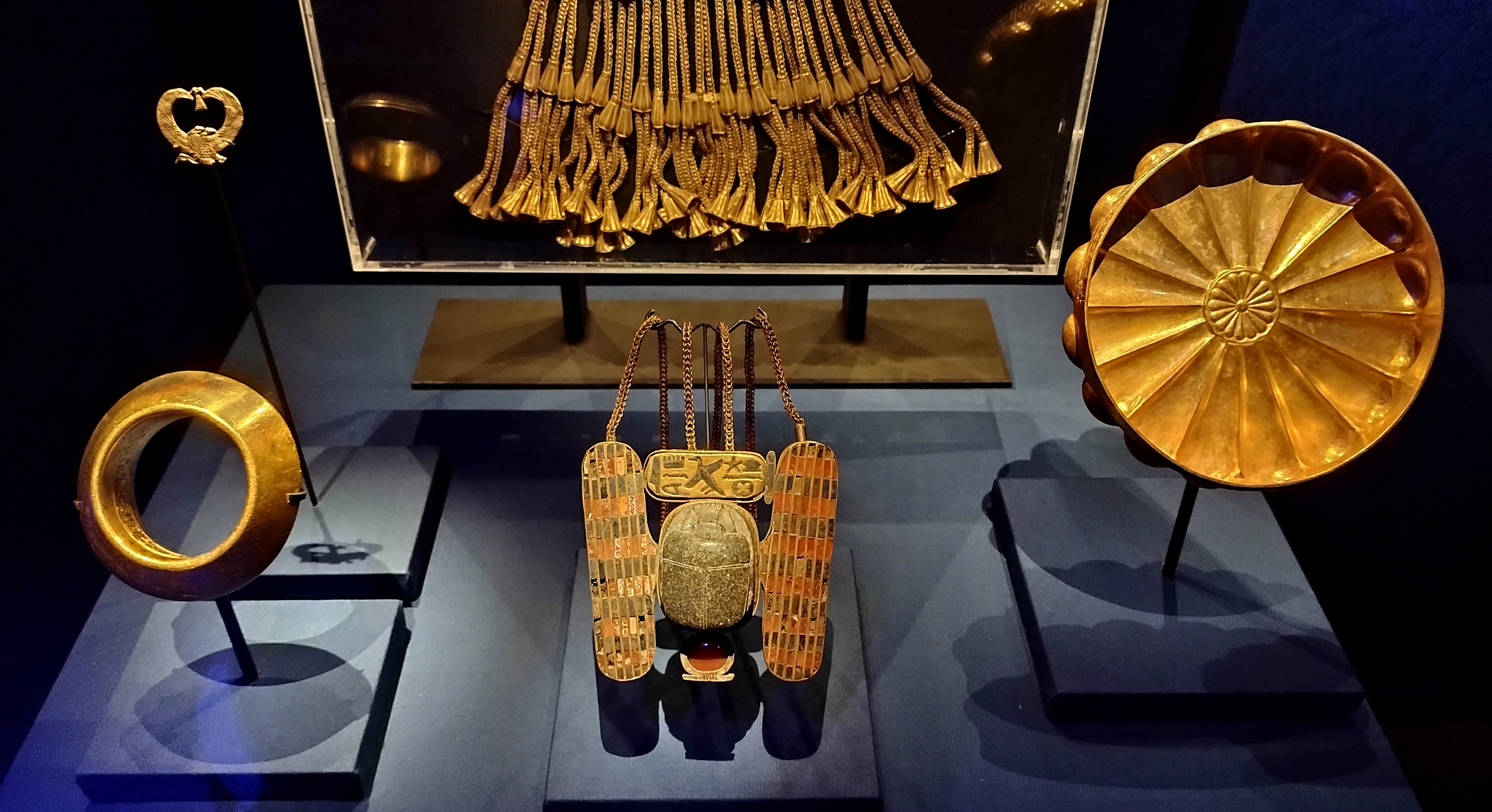
Psusennes I's small pectoral and gold cup

At Tanis, the Tomb of Psusennes I (NRT III) was discovered intact by Pierre Montet in 1940. Due to its moist Lower Egypt location, most of the perishable wood objects were destroyed by water – a fate not shared by KV62, the tomb of Tutankhamun in the drier climate of Upper Egypt. In contrast to KV62, Psusennes I's tomb holds the distinction of being the only pharaonic grave ever found unscathed by any tomb robbing attempts. The tomb of Tutankhamun had been robbed twice in antiquity.

In spite of the destruction of wooden artifacts within the tomb due to the moist Nile delta area, the king's funerary mask was recovered intact; it proved to be made of gold and lapis lazuli and held inlays of black and white glass for the eyes and eyebrows of the object. Psusennes I's mask is considered to be "one of the masterpieces of the treasure[s] of Tanis" and is currently housed in Room 2 of the Cairo Museum. It has a maximum width and height of 38 cm and 48 cm respectively. The pharaoh's "fingers and toes had been encased in gold stalls, and he was buried with gold sandals on his feet. The finger stalls are the most elaborate ever found, with sculpted fingernails. Each finger wore an elaborate ring of gold and lapis lazuli or some other semiprecious stone."

Psusennes I's outer and middle sarcophagi had been recycled from previous burials in the Valley of the Kings through the state-sanctioned tomb robbing that was common practice in the Third Intermediate Period. A cartouche on the red outer sarcophagus shows that it had originally been made for Pharaoh Merenptah, the 19th Dynasty successor of Ramesses II, as the middle sarcophagus. Psusennes I, himself, was interred in an "inner silver coffin" which was inlaid with gold. Since "silver was considerably rarer in Egypt than gold," Psusennes I's silver "coffin represents a sumptuous burial of great wealth during Egypt's declining years."

Dr. Douglas Derry, who worked as the head of Cairo University's Anatomy Department, examined the king's remains in 1940 and determined that the king was an old man when he died. Derry noted that Psusennes I's teeth were badly worn and full of cavities, that he had an abscess that left a hole in his palate, and observed that the king suffered from extensive arthritis and was probably crippled by this condition in his final years.

== Gallery ==
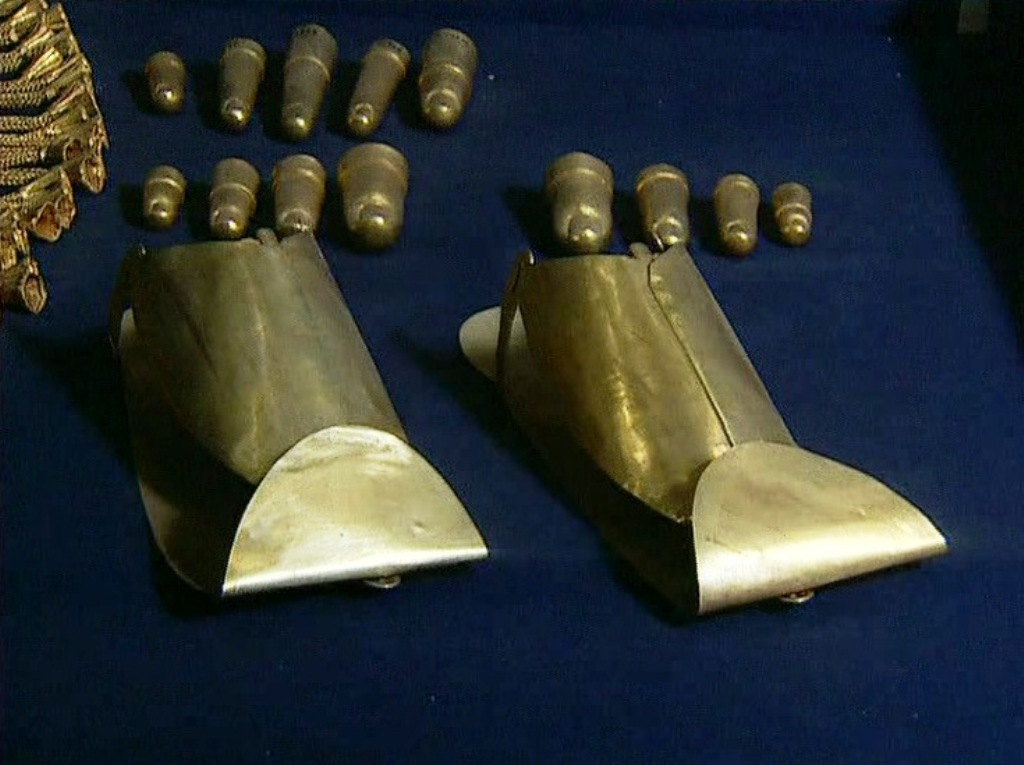
Psusennes I's gold sandals and finger and toe stalls

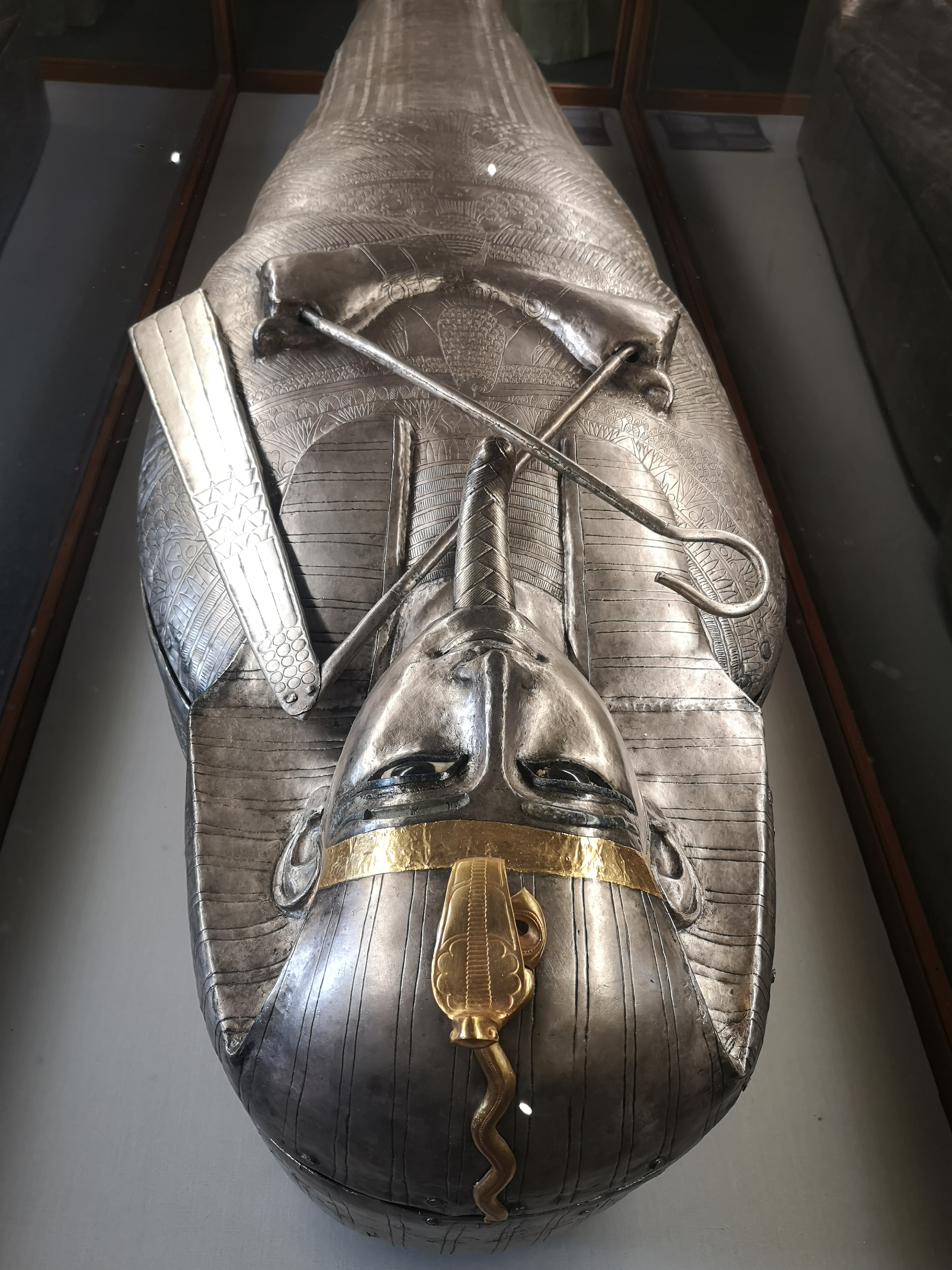
The silver coffin of Psusennes I at the Egyptian Museum

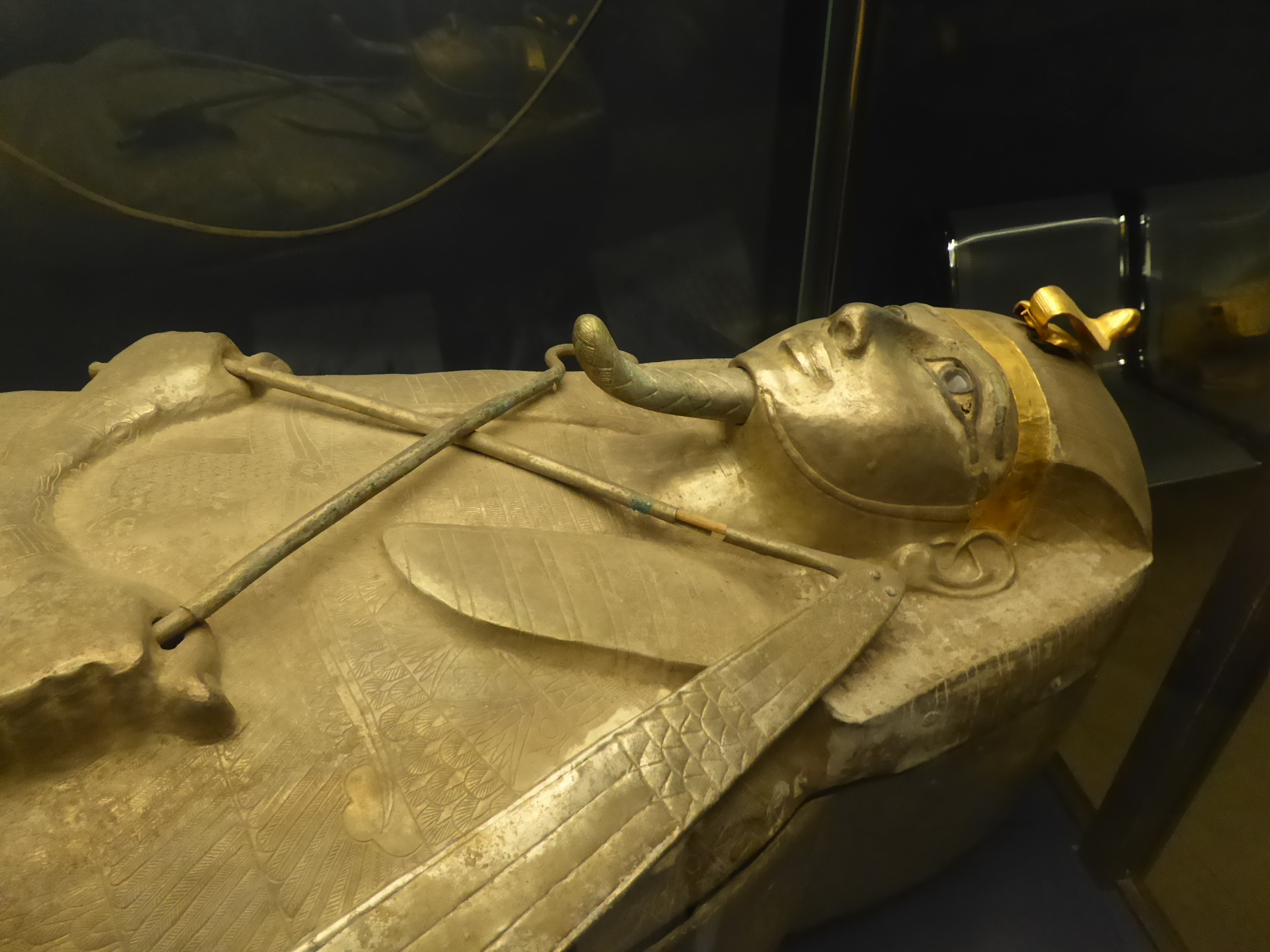
Psusennes I's silver coffin

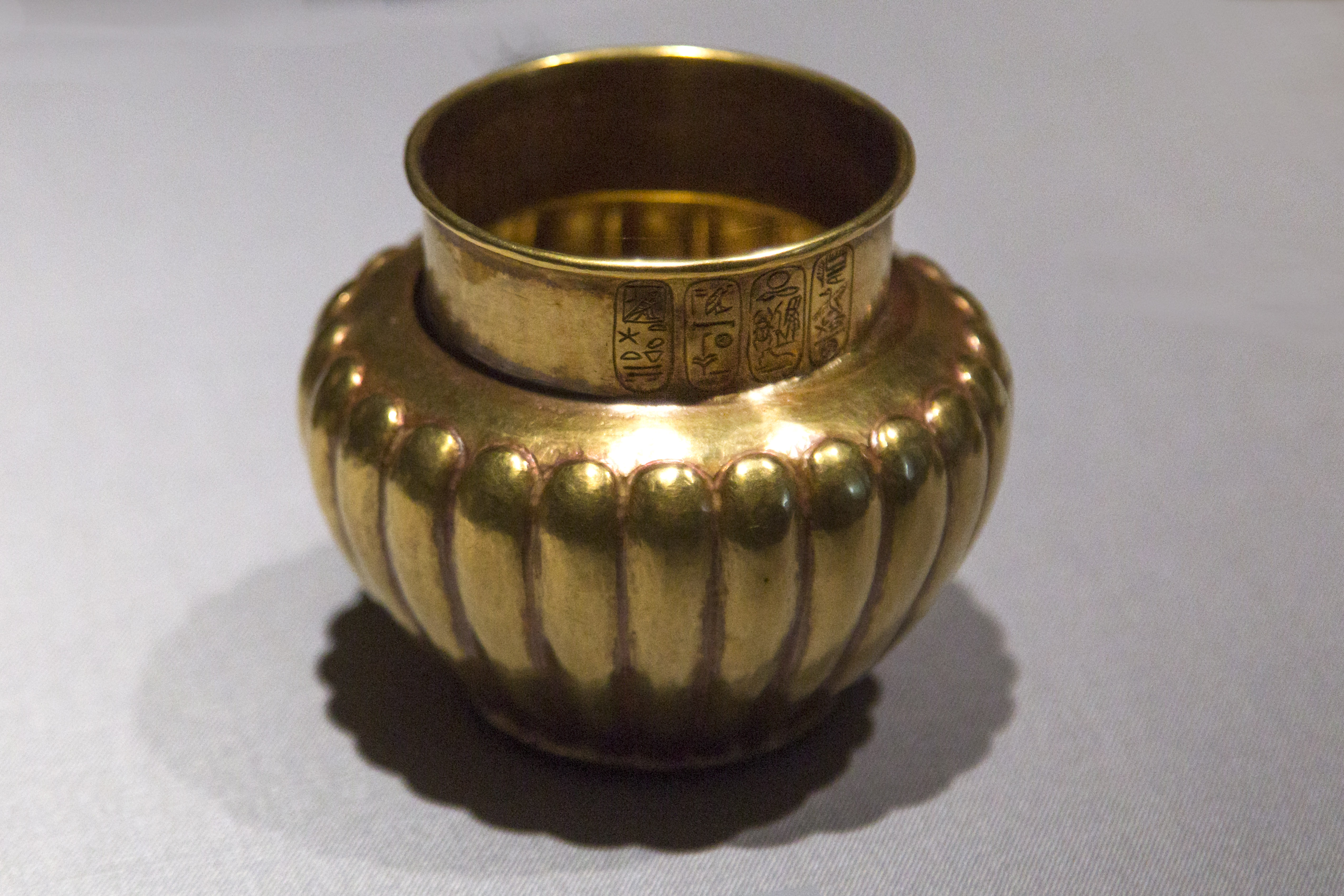
Psusennes I's Gadrooned golden vase (JE 85896)

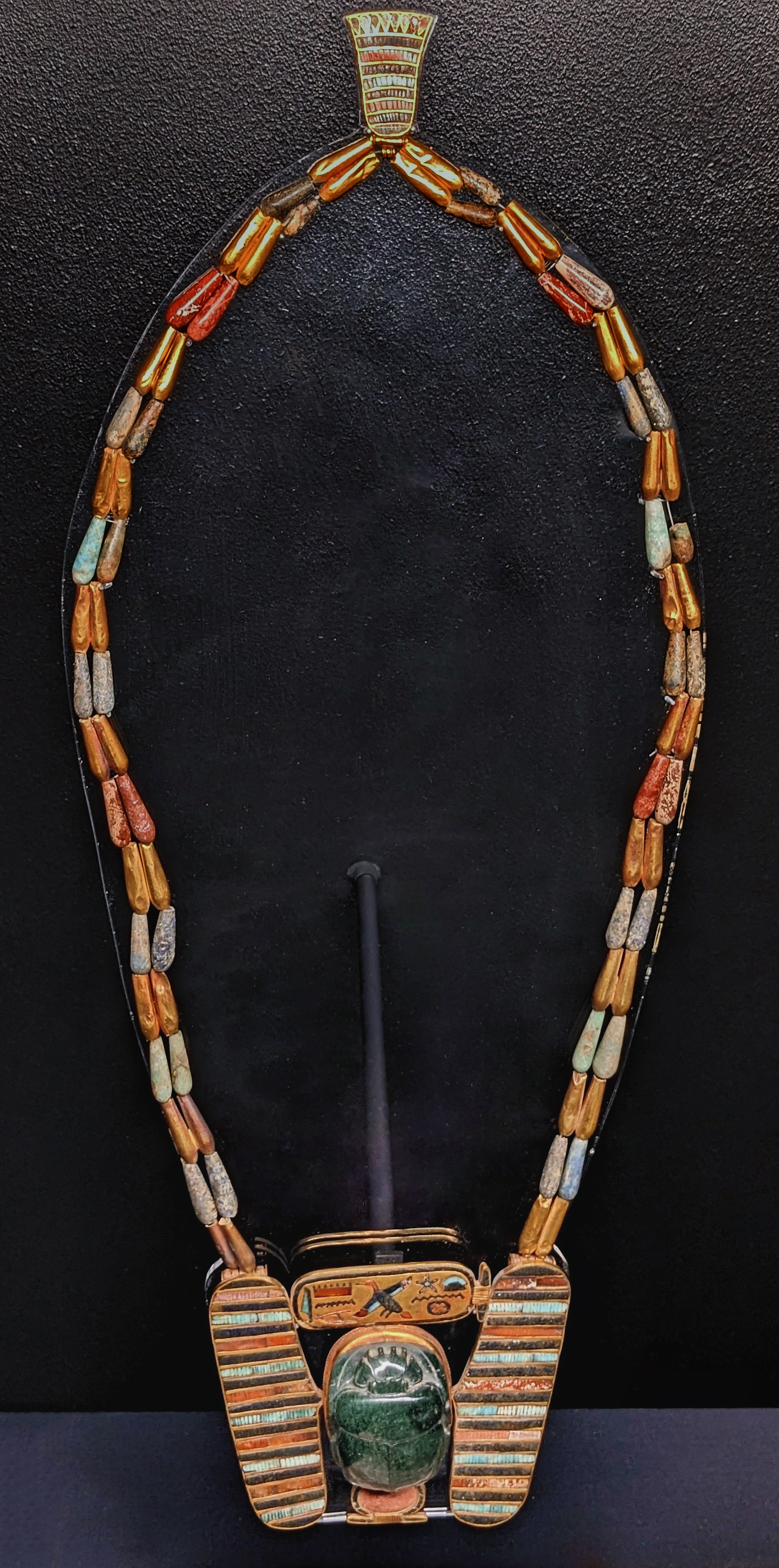
An exquisite pectoral necklace of Psusennes I

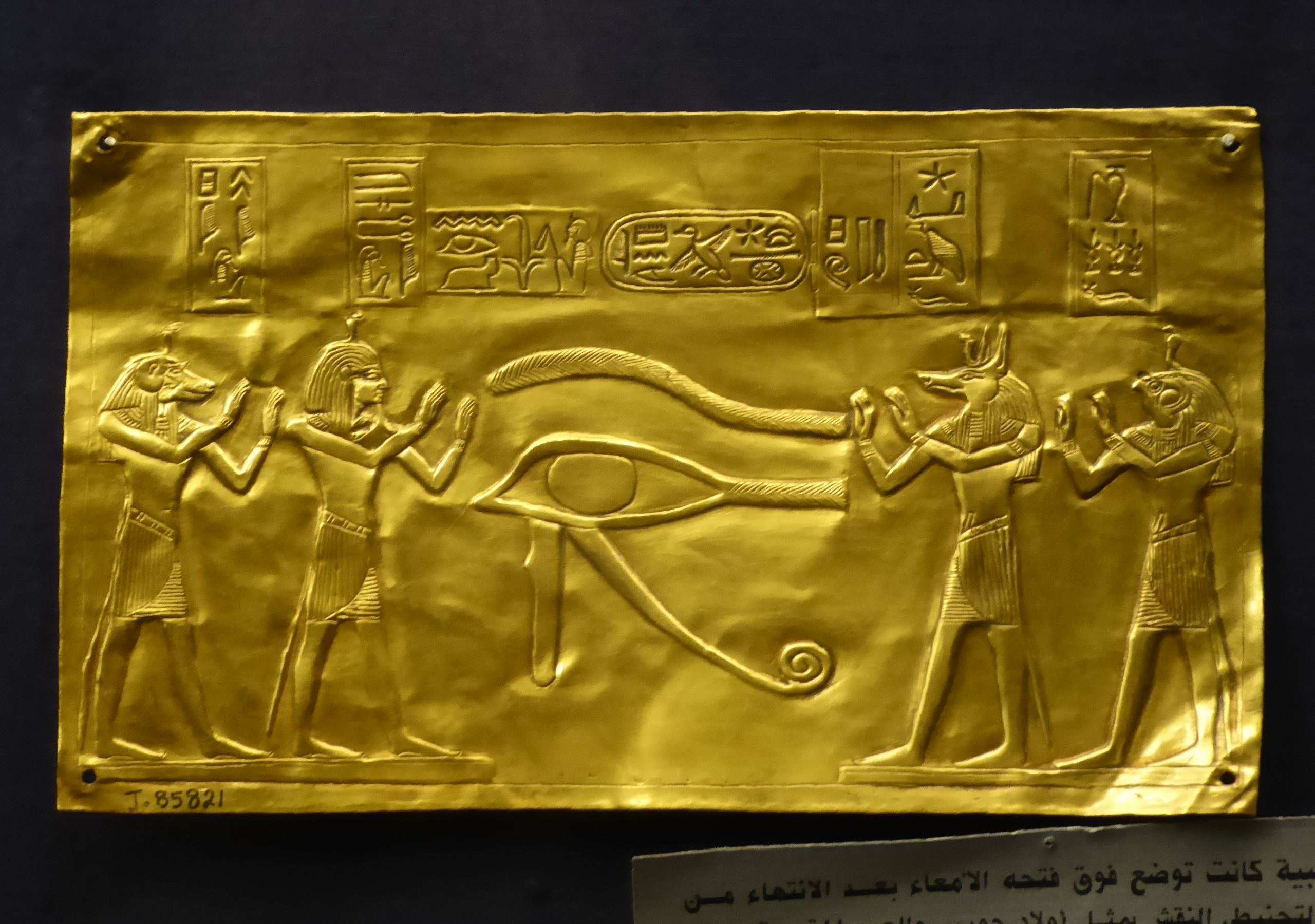
A Gold Plaque of Psusennes I depicting the Eye of Ra and Horus

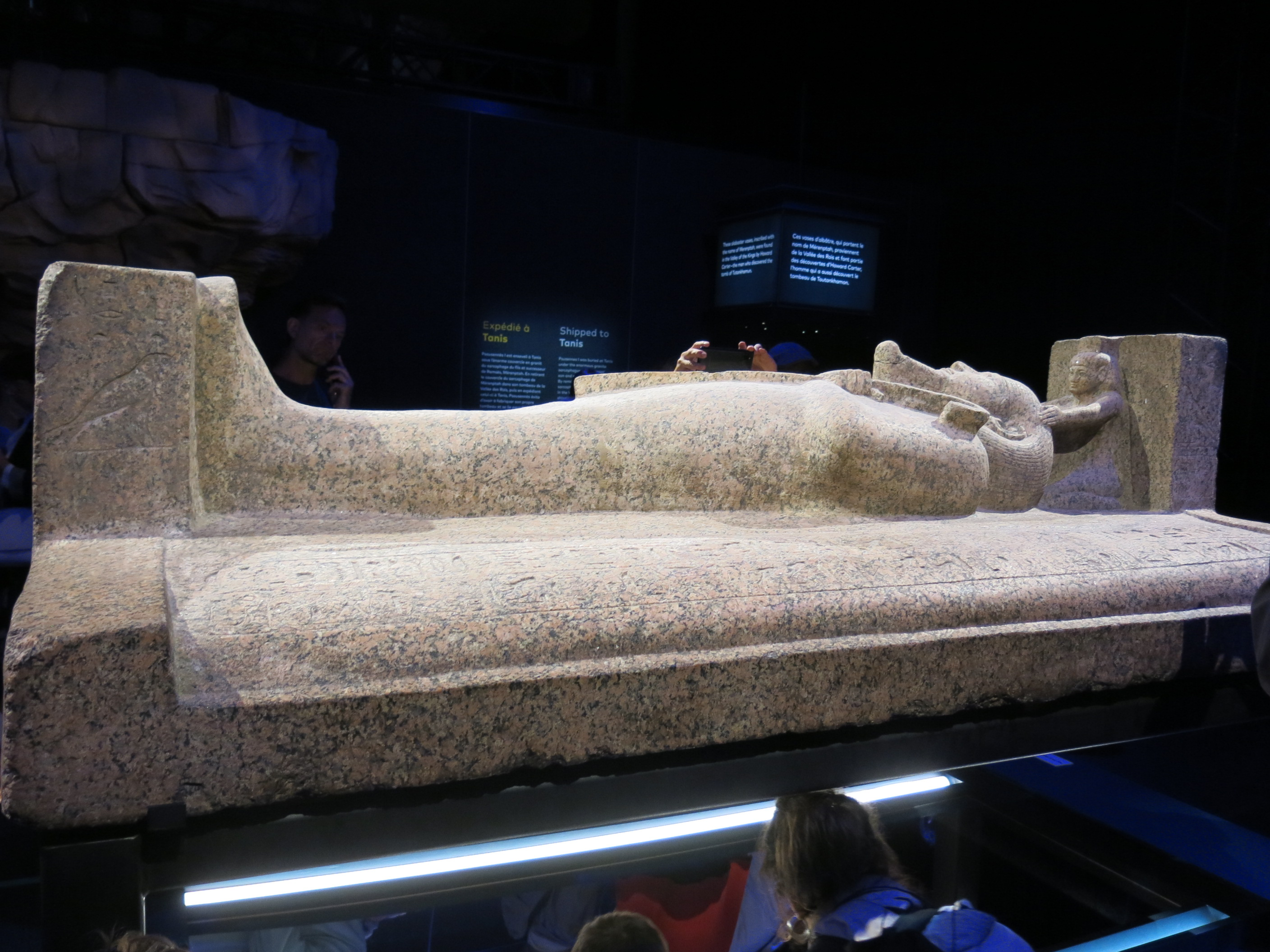
The middle sarcophagus of Merneptah, which was reused by Psusennes I as the outer sarcophagus for his own burial

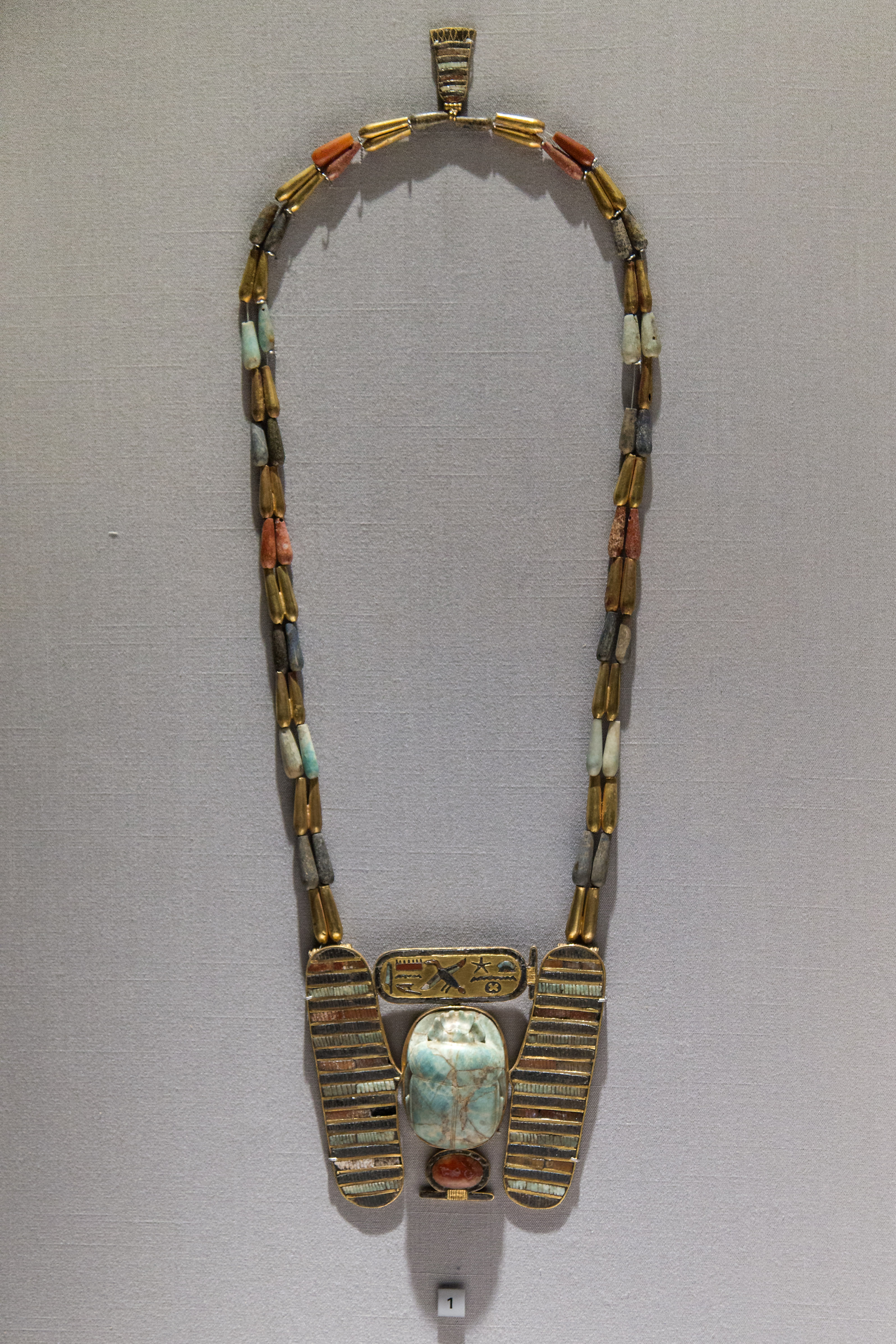
Pectoral Necklace of Psusennes I in the Egyptian Museum
