= Tentamun =

U33 n t i mn n B1
Tentamun
in hieroglyphs

Tentamun or Tentamen (t3-n.t-ỉmn; "she of Amun") is an ancient Egyptian feminine name. Its notable bearers are:

- Tentamun (18th dynasty), a princess of the 18th dynasty, daughter of Thutmose IV
- Tentamun (20th dynasty), a queen of the 20th dynasty, probably the wife of Ramesses XI
- Tentamun (21st dynasty), a princess and queen of the 21st dynasty, wife of Smendes, probably the daughter of Ramesses XI
