= Ramesses XII =

Egyptian pharaoh of the 20th dynasty

- Also written Ramses and Rameses
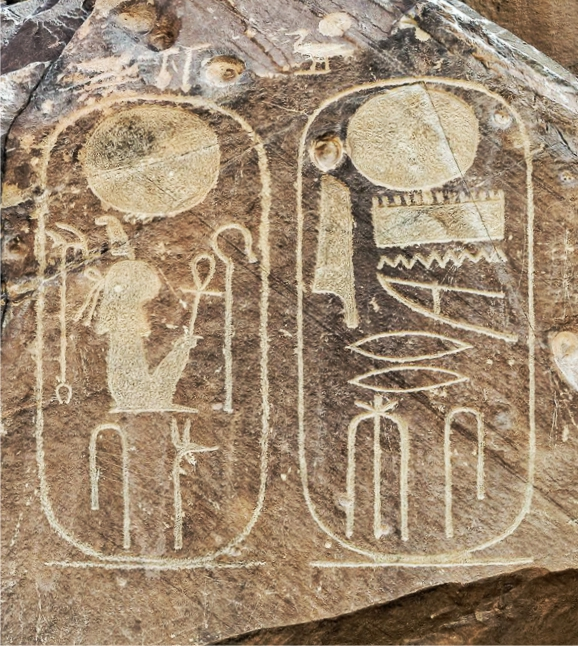

Pharaoh
- Reign: c. 1075–1068 BC
- Predecessor: Ramesses XI?
- Successor: Smendes?
Royal titulary
Prenomen
Usermaatre Heqawaset
Wsr-m3ˁt-Rˁ-ḥq3-W3st
The strong one belonging to the justice of Ra, ruler of Thebes
M23 t L2 t < N5 S38 C10 R19 wsr S29 >
Nomen
Rameses Mereramun
Rˁ-msj-sw-mrr-Jmn
Ra is the one who bore him, whom Amun continually loves
G39 N5 < N5 M17 Y5 N35 U6 D21 D21 F31 S29 >
- Father: Ramesses XI?
- Died: 1068 BC ?
- Dynasty: 20th Dynasty

Usermaatre-heqawaset Rameses-mereramun (Egyptian wsr-mȝʿt-rʿ ḥqȝ-wȝst sȝ-rʿ rʿ-ms-s mrr-jmn) is an obscure pharaoh tentatively placed at the end of the Twentieth Dynasty, in possibly c. 1075–1068 BC. The royal name is unquestionably attested as such in a single known inscription, Wadi Hammamat text 22, but although associated by several scholars with the well-known Ramesses II, it appears to designate a distinct king who might belong in the obscure period of transition between the Twentieth and Twenty-first Dynasties.

== Evidence and interpretation ==
Wadi Hammamat text 22 consists of simple royal titles preceding two carefully carved cartouches, reading "Perfect God, Lord of the Two Lands: Usermaatre-heqawast, Son of Ra: Rameses-mereramun" (nṯr-nfr nb-tȝwj wsr-mȝʿt-rʿ ḥqȝ-wȝst sȝ-rʿ rʿ-ms-s mrr-jmn).

The royal name Usermaatre-heqawast Rameses-mereramun was known since the early days of Egyptology. Without specifically citing Wadi Hammamat text 22 as their source, Carl Richard Lepsius and Émile Brugsch and Urbain Bouriant included the royal name in their respective books of kings of Ancient Egypt in 1858 and 1887, assigning it tentatively to the Twentieth Dynasty without proposing an identification with any other known king. In his work on the Wadi Hammamat inscriptions, Pierre Montet identified the king of Wadi Hammamat text 22 as Ramesses II in the Nineteenth Dynasty, citing a personal communication from Henri Gauthier. Gauthier himself did likewise, albeit with some reservations, in his own book of kings. This identification was readily accepted by a number of scholars. The rationale for the identification was only indicated, briefly, by Kenneth Kitchen, who cited Ramesses II's "early usage of employing the simple prenomen Usimare … but with variable epithets," pointing to the Gebel Silsila stela of Year 1.

Subsequently, Ian Mladjov questioned this identification of Usemaatre-heqawast Rameses-mereramun with Ramesses II based on a more detailed analysis of the royal names in the Gebel Silsila stela and the Wadi Hammamat inscription. He noted that the throne name and epithet combination Usermaatre-heqawast occurs only once among the names of Ramesses II on the Gebel Silsila stela, among four other and better-represented variant forms, including the standard one (Usermaatre-setepenre), and that such variant forms are attested elsewhere, if at all, only alongside the standard throne name, which is not the case in Wadi Hammamat text 22. He also noted that the birth name's epithet mereramun "stands in minute but significant contrast to the well-attested epithet of Ramesses II-meryamun," that it was deliberately inscribed and not a likely error, also militating against identification with Ramesses II (who is never mereramun in the ample attestations of his names) and toward the Twentieth Dynasty and particularly its end, where it was the standard birth name epithet of Ramesses IX and Ramesses XI. On this evidence, Mladjov concluded that Usermaatre-heqawast Rameses-mereramun was a distinct king, probably belonging to the end of the Twentieth Dynasty, and possibly identifiable as the unnamed king (who cannot be plausibly identified with either Ramesses XI or Smendes) in whose regnal years 5 and 6 is attested the High Priest of Amun Herihor, making him Ramesses XII.

The existence of this unnamed king is deduced as a consequence of the now widely accepted reversal of the previously postulated order of the High Priests of Amūn Herihor–Piankh by Karl Jansen-Winkeln. Ad Thijs attempted to address the problem by splitting the High Priest and subsequently King Pinedjem I into two persons and identifying King Pinedjem with the unnamed monarch, while Rolf Krauss proposed that the reign intervening between those of Ramesses XI and Smendes belonged to Herihor himself. An alternative proposed by Aidan Dodson, that Herihor officiated as High Priest interrupting the tenure of Piankh, is based on the argument of ostensible damnatio memoriae perpetrated against Herihor on a single stela. The splitting up of the High Priest and later King Pinedjem into two distinct individuals is considered implausible, while Krauss' solution, otherwise plausible, allows the paradox of Herihor using his own regnal years without claiming a royal title, which leads Mladjov to propose placing Usermaatre-heqawast Rameses-mereramun as Ramesses XII at this point, where the name, chronology, and absence of contradictory evidence would allow it. On the other hand, the absence of other clear attestations of the king prevent further confirmation of the theory, and Mladjov admits a possible problem in the non-appearance of the postulated Ramesses XII in the decoration of the Temple of Khonsu, where Herihor appears both as High Priest of Amun under Ramesses XI and as king in his own right; nevertheless, the author allows for the possibility of Herihor interrupting work on the project, on the basis of parallels in Egyptian construction history. In terms of chronological placement (within the generally accepted Egyptian Low Chronology), Mladjov finds that there is ample time between the last explicitly attested (Ramesses XI Year 27, c. 1081 BC), last reasonably certain (Renaissance (wḥm-mswt) Year 10, c. 1080 BC, or Renaissance Year 12, c. 1078 BC), or last arguably assignable (Renaissance? Year 15, c. 1075 BC?) year of Ramesses XI's reign and the first year of Smendes' reign (1068 BC) for fitting in the postulated Ramesses XII, whose highest assignable regnal year (Year 6) guarantees a reign of at least five years and a fraction. Mladjov also speculates that, for whatever reasons, the reign of Ramesses XII witnessed the gradual assumption of effective authority over Upper and Lower Egypt by Herihor and Smendes, respectively, prior to them succeeding him as kings.

Mladjov's study has been cited but rarely discussed, given the sparsity of evidence, although other Egyptian pharaohs (e.g., Shoshenq VI, Shoshenq VII) have been tentatively identified on the basis of similarly minimal attestation. David Aston noted the proposed identification and placement of Ramesses XII, with the reservation that his apparent absence from the Temple of Khonsu needs to be explained and that "the problem of the unknown king persists, and he might well be a(n unknown) King Rameses."

== Other uses of "Ramesses XII" ==
Early listings of Egyptian kings used to insert additional names in the sequence, turning the well-attested king now known as Ramesses XI into Ramesses XIII or Ramesses XII. Thus, Lepsius inserted Rameses-Siptah as Ramesses XI and the Rameses-meryamun of the Bentresh Stela (then known as the "Bakhtan Stela") as Ramesses XII. Brugsch and Bouriant inserted Rameses-Siptah as Ramesses IX and the Rameses-meryamun of the Bentresh Stela as Ramesses XII. Budge correctly saw the Rameses-meryamun of the Bentresh Stela as a reflection of the historical Ramesses II, but inserted Rameses-Siptah as Ramesses IX. The earlier authors — apart from Budge, who ignores him — listed Usermaatre-heqawast Rameses-mereramun as a possible additional king in the Twentieth Dynasty, while Gauthier identified him as "probably" Ramesses II. Gauthier also identified the Rameses-meryamun of the Bentresh Stela as Ramesses II, and suggested identifying Rameses-Siptah as another name for Siptah-merneptah, the king we commonly call simply Siptah. In this manner, the indisputable kings named Ramesses were reduced to eleven (not counting Rameses-Siptah, referred to as Siptah), as common in Egyptology today. Usermaatre-heqawast Rameses-mereramun would be an additional king named Ramesses.

=== In historical fiction ===
Polish author Bolesław Prus (1847–1912) set his historical fiction Pharaoh (Faraon, 1895) at the end of the Twentieth Dynasty, centering on the idealistic young protagonist he designated Ramesses XIII, undone by a corrupt system and succeeded as king by the High Priest Herihor. Prus' Ramesses XII and Ramesses XIII were named in accordance with the naming and numbering of Egyptian kings by the scholars of his time. Prus' Ramesses XIII is often seen as a fictitious character (which he certainly is in terms of the experiences and actions ascribed to him), which would imply that Prus' Ramesses XII corresponds to our modern Ramesses XI, but both Lepsius and Brugsch and Bouriant had our Ramesses XI as Ramesses XIII.

== Bibliography ==
- Aston, David 2020, "The Third Intermediate Period," Chapter 32 in: Ian Shaw & Elizabeth Bloxam, eds., The Oxford Handbook of Egyptology, Oxford University Press: Oxford: 990-1044.
- Bennett, James E., The Archaeology of Egypt in the Third Intermediate Period, Cambridge University Press: Cambridge.
- Brugsch-Bey, Émile, and Urbain Bouriant 1887, Le livre des rois contenant la liste chronologique des rois, reines, princes, princesses et personnages importants de l'Égypte depuis Ménès jusqu'a Nectanebo II, Cairo. online
- Budge, E. A. W. 1908, The Book of Kings of Egypt, vol. 2, Paul, Trench, and Trübner: London.
- Couyat, Jean and Pierre Montet 1912, Les inscriptions hiéroglyphiques et hiératiques du Ouâdi Hammâmât (= Memoires de l'institut français d'archéologie orientale 34), Cairo. online
- Dodson, Aidan 2012, Afterglow of Empire: Egypt from the Fall of the New Kingdom to the Saite Renaissance, American University in Cairo: Cairo.
- Gardiner, Alan 1958, "Only One King Siptah and Twosre not his Wife", Journal of Egyptian Archaeology 44: 12-22.
- Gauthier, Henri 1914, Le livre des rois d'Égypte, vol. 3. Institut français d’archéologie orientale: Cairo. online
- Gregory, S. R. W. 2014, Herihor in art and iconography: kingship and the gods in the ritual landscape of Late New Kingdom Thebes, Golden House: London.
- Kitchen, Kenneth A. 1987, "The titularies of the Ramesside kings as expression of their ideal kingship," Annales du Service des Antiquités de l'Égypte 71: 131-141.
- Kitchen, Kenneth. A. 1998, Ramesside Inscriptions Translated & Annotated: Notes and Comments, vol. 2, Blackwell: Oxford.
- Krauss, Rolf 2015, "Egyptian Chronology: Ramesses II through Shoshenq III, with analysis of the lunar dates of Thutmoses III," Ägypten und Levante 25: 335-382.
- Jansen-Winkeln, Karl 1992, "Das Ende des Neuen Reiches," Zeitschrift für Ägyptische Sprache und Altertumskunde 119: 22-37.
- Leprohon, Ronald J. 2013, The Great Name: Ancient Egyptian Royal Titulary, Society of Biblical Literature: Atlanta.
- Lepsius, Carl Richard 1858, Königsbuch der Alten Ägypter, vol. 2, Hertz: Berlin. online
- Mladjov, Ian 2017, "The Transition between the Twentieth and Twenty-First Dynasties Revisited," Birmingham Egyptology Journal 5: 1-23. online and online
- Peden, Alexander J. 2001, The Graffitti of Pharaonic Egypt: Scope and roles of informal writing (c. 3100–332 BC), Brill: Leiden.
- Thijs, Ad 2005, "In Search of King Herihor and the Penultimate Ruler of the 20th Dynasty," Zeitschrift für Ägyptische Sprache und Altertumskunde 132: 73-91.
- Toledo Stella, Thomas Henriquez 2020, "Convulsões Sociais no Antigo Egito: Os Trabalhadores da Necrópole Tebana no Final do Novo Reinado," Mare Nostrum 10: 1-23.
