= Henuttawy (princess) =

- King's Daughter; Singer of Amun; Flautist of Mut
- Burial: MMA 60
- Dynasty: 21st Dynasty
- Father: Pinedjem I
- Mother: Duathathor-Henuttawy

Henuttawy B (“Lady of the Two Lands”) was an ancient Egyptian princess of the 21st Dynasty. Her father was Pinedjem I, High Priest of Amun and de facto ruler of Southern Egypt, her mother was Duathathor-Henuttawy, a daughter of Ramesses XI. She is depicted in the Luxor temple with her father and two sisters, Maatkare and Mutnedjmet. She was a Singer of Amun and Flautist of Mut.

She was buried in MMA 60 in Deir el-Bahari with relatives.

== Sources ==
- Aidan Dodson & Dyan Hilton: The Complete Royal Families of Ancient Egypt. Thames & Hudson, 2004, ISBN 0-500-05128-3, p. 205
