= Nauny =

Ancient Egyptian princess

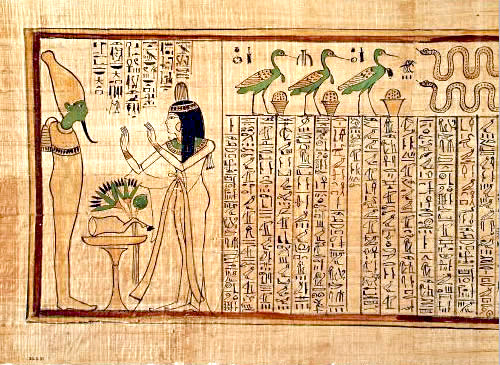

n G1 Z2ss n Z4 M17 M17 B1
Nauny
in hieroglyphs
Era: 3rd Intermediate Period
(1069–664 BC)

Nauny or Nany (earlier reading: Entiuny) was an ancient Egyptian princess during the Twenty-first Dynasty, probably a daughter of High Priest, later Pharaoh Pinedjem I. The name of her mother, Tentnabekhenu is known only from Nauny's funerary papyrus.

== Life ==
Her titles, known from her tomb are King's Daughter of His Body, Singer of Amun, Lady of the House. This title is mentioned on an Osiris figure from her burial. She is likely to have been Pinedjem's daughter because she was buried at Deir el-Bahri, a popular burial place for the royal family of this period, close to Bab el-Gasus, which was also a popular burial place, for priests; also, Pinedjem's daughter Henuttawy and his probable daughter-in-law Djedmutesankh were buried nearby and Henuttawy's mummy and coffins show similarities with those of Nauny. Nauny's mother, Tentnabekhenu, is also called a King's Daughter on the Book of the Dead. It is not clear if Tentnabekhenu was a daughter of Herihor or possibly a Tanite King.

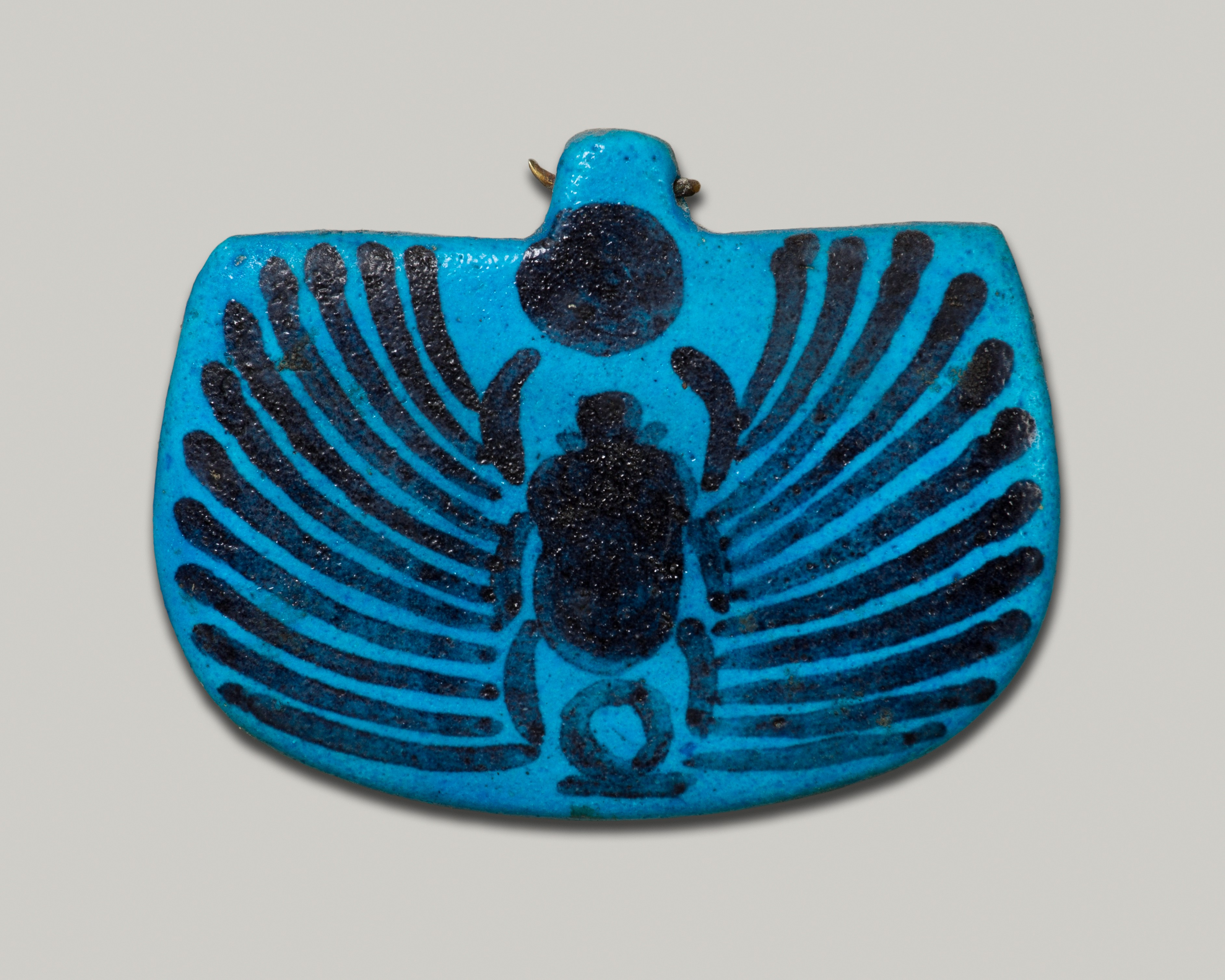
Winged Scarab Pectoral of Nany, MET

== Death and burial ==
The mummy was unwrapped by Winlock and examined by Winlock and Derry in 1929 or 1930. Nauny was short (about 145 cm) and fat, similarly to two other children of Pinedjem, Henuttawy and High Priest Masaharta. She was about 70 years old at death.

Theban Tomb TT358, where she was buried, belonged originally to an early 18th Dynasty queen, Ahmose-Meritamen, the sister-wife of Amenhotep I. The tomb was restored in Pinedjem's 19th regnal year and was used for Nauny's burial later; according to Winlock, a generation later, because those responsible for Nauny's burial did not know the original plan of the tomb.

Nauny's sycamore coffins were originally made for her mother. Among the objects in her tomb 392 ushabtis (in seven boxes), a scarab amulet, an Osiris statue and a copy of the Book of the Dead (within the hollowed statue) were found.
