= Maatkare Mutemhat =

- God's Wife of Amun
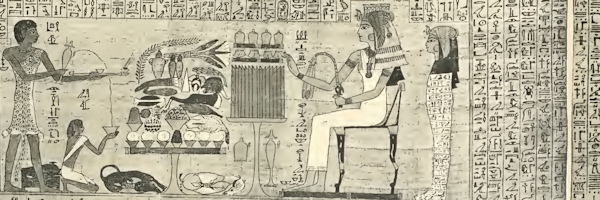
- Maatkare Mutemhat depicted in her Book of the Dead
Egyptian name
nTr dwA t ra mAat kA
- Dynasty: 21st dynasty of Egypt
- Died: Thebes?
- Burial: DB320
- Father: Pinedjem I
- Mother: Duathathor-Henuttawy

Maatkare Mutemhat was an ancient Egyptian high priestess, a God's Wife of Amun during the 21st Dynasty.

== History ==
She was the daughter of High Priest of Amun Pinedjem I, who was the de facto ruler of Southern Egypt from 1070 BCE onwards, then proclaimed himself pharaoh in 1054 BCE. Her mother was Duathathor-Henuttawy, a daughter of Ramesses XI, last ruler of the 20th dynasty. Maatkare received the title of God's Wife of Amun during her father's reign; she was the first God's Wife to take on a praenomen which used to be the prerogative of pharaohs. Her siblings held important positions too: a brother of hers became pharaoh, a sister became queen, and three brothers held the title High Priest of Amun in succession. She was followed as God's Wife by her niece Henuttawy D, daughter of her brother, High Priest Menkheperre.

Several of her depictions are known: she was depicted as a young girl in the Luxor temple, along with her sisters Henuttawy B and Mutnedjmet, also, as high priestess on the facade of the Temple of Khonsu at Karnak, and on a statue which is now in Marseille.

== Burial ==
Her original burial place is unknown; her mummy was found in the DB320 cache along with her coffins, shawabtis and other mummies from her immediate family. A small mummy, originally thought to be a child of hers was later revealed to be that of a pet monkey (God's Wives were supposed to be celibate).

Preceded by n.d.	God's Wife of Amun; 21st Dynasty	Succeeded by Henuttawy D
