= Duathathor-Henuttawy =

- King's Daughter; Foremost Singer of Amun; Lady of the Two Lands
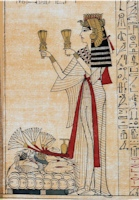
- Duathathor-Henuttawy from her book of dead
- Burial: Reburied in DB320
- Spouse: Pinedjem I
- Issue: Psusennes I Mutnedjmet; Maatkare; Henuttawy? Masaharta? Djedkhonsuefankh? Menkheperre?
Egyptian name
O10 dwA H8 t W10 t N17 N17
- Dynasty: 20th dynasty
- Father: Probably Ramesses XI
- Mother: Tentamun

Duathathor-Henuttawy, Henuttawy or Henttawy ("Adorer of Hathor; Mistress of the Two Lands") was an ancient Egyptian princess and later queen.

== Family ==
Henuttawy is likely to have been the daughter of Ramesses XI, last king of the 20th dynasty by Tentamun.

The placement of Henuttawy in the royal families of the late 20th dynasty and the early 21st dynasty is not entirely clear and open to interpretation. Duathathor-Henuttawy held several titles, including King's Daughter; King's Wife; King's Mother; Lady of the Two Lands; Mistress of the Two Lands; Daughter of the Great Royal Wife; Foremost Singer of Amun; Mother of the Great Royal Wife; Mother of the High Priest of Amun; Mother of Generalissimo.

Edward F. Wente had conjectured that Henuttawy was the daughter of Smendes and Queen Tentamun, the wife of Pinudjem I and the mother of King Psusennes and his wife, Mutnodjmet, The High Priest of Amun Menkheperre, the Generalissimo of the South and North, Menkheperre, and God's Wife of Amun Maatkare. Kenneth Kitchen had conjectured there were two women called Henuttawy during the period to explain some of the titles associated with the name Henuttawy.

Wente had shown that Henuttawy was the wife of Pinedjem I, the Theban High Priest of Amun who was de facto ruler of Upper Egypt and took on pharaonic titles later on.

The titles attested for Henuttawy helps us identify which of Pinedjem's children were hers: Psusennes I, who went on to become pharaoh in Tanis; his wife Mutnedjmet; and Maatkare, who became God's Wife of Amun. It is likely she was also the mother of Henuttawy who is depicted along with Maatkare and Mutnedjmet in Karnak. It is more difficult to identify the high priest referred to in her titles: three of Pinedjem's sons, Masaharta, Djedkhonsuefankh and Menkheperre became high priests, and one, two, or all three of them could have been Duathathor-Henuttawy's son.

Niwiński conjectured that Henuttawy was the daughter of Ramesses XI and Tentamun. Dodson recognizes two queens named Tentamun. One is the wife of Ramesses XI and the mother of Henuttawy. This queen is mentioned in the funerary papyrus of Queen Hennutawy. Another queen named Tentamun was presumably a daughter of Ramesses XI and possibly a full sister of Henuttawy, and she was married to Smendes. The latter Tentamun is mentioned in the Story of Wenamun.

She is mentioned before her husband's ascendence to the throne on a chalice found in Tanis, on a door lintel and on a relief in the Khonsu temple in the Karnak temple complex. Even here she is mentioned as a queen, with her name written in a cartouche. Later she is also mentioned on a stela in Coptos, in Mut's temple in Karnak and on several objects found in her son's tomb in Tanis. She is depicted on the facade of the Khonsu temple in Karnak.

== Death and burial ==
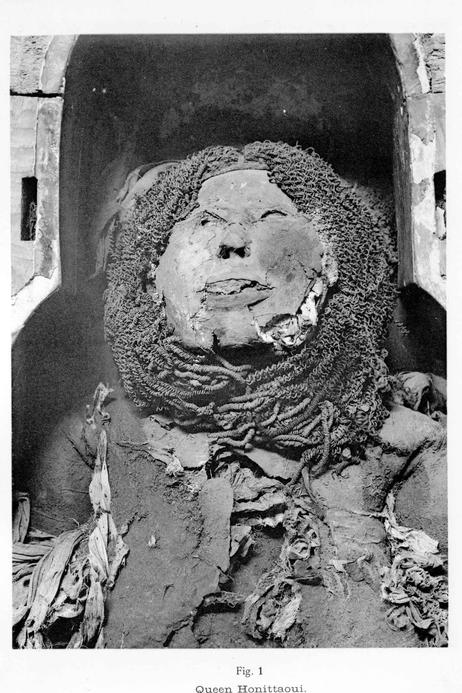
Mummy of Henuttawy prior to restoration

Her mummy and coffins were found in the DB320 cache along with those of several members of her immediate family. She was buried elsewhere before being moved to the cache, but the original place of burial is not known.

Henuttawy's mummy was found in a set of two wooden coffins. The coffins must have been covered in gold, but all of the gold had been adzed off. They are now in the Egyptian Museum of Cairo. The mummy was damaged by tomb robbers. In the search for the heart scarab the main part of the chest area had been penetrated. Packing linen under a subject's skin had become common practice in 20th Dynasty mummification, but had caused the flesh on the face of Lady Henuttawy to burst open. The face was restored after discovery.

Auguste Mariette purchased two large funerary papyrus rolls that are thought to have belonged to Queen Henuttawy.
