= Hrere =

F18 Y1 rw Z1 rw Z1 B1 M2
Hrere
in hieroglyphs
Era: 3rd Intermediate Period
(1069–664 BC)

Hrere (sometimes spelled as Hrēre or Herere; ḥrr.t, "flower") was an ancient Egyptian noble lady of the late 20th-early 21st dynasties of Egypt.

Although during her life she must have been an influential person, not much is known for certain about her family relationships. The names of her parents have not come down to us and the identity of her husband is not beyond dispute. She is often seen as either the wife or grandmother of the High Priest at Thebes. Piankh.

As will be explained below, Hrere’s exact place in the family of Theban High Priests ultimately depends on two factors, neither of which has yet been resolved:

1. the identity of her daughter Nodjmet
2. the relative order of Herihor and Piankh

== Her relation to Nodjmet ==
The only thing which can be established beyond doubt is that she was the mother of the lady Nodjmet, whose mummy and funerary outfit have been found in the Great Royal Cache near Deir el-Bahri. Two Books of the Dead were found with Nodjmet's mummy. One of them, Papyrus BM 10490, now in the British Museum, belonged to “the King’s Mother Nodjmet, the daughter of the King’s Mother Hrere”. Whereas Nodjmet's name was written in a cartouche, the name of Hrere was not. Since Nodjmet is often seen as the wife of the High Priest Herihor, who is also attested with royal titles, Hrere’s title is often interpreted as “King’s Mother-in-law”, although her title “who bore the Strong Bull” suggests that she had given birth to a king.

Recently, however, the common opinion that there was only one Queen Nodjmet has been challenged, and the old view that the mummy found in the Royal Cache was that of the mother of Herihor rather than his wife has been revived. Although it is beyond dispute that Herihor had a queen called Nodjmet (this was already recognised by Champollion), Édouard Naville postulated in 1878 that Herihor must have had a mother called Nodjmet. He did so on the basis of Papyrus BM 10541, the other Book of the Dead found with her mummy. Although Herihor figures in P. BM 10541, neither of Nodjmet's two Books of the Dead has Nodjmet designated as “King’s Wife”. All the stress is on her position as “King’s Mother”, as if this was her only title relevant in relation to Herihor. The ruling family from the transitional period from the 20th to the 21st dynasty is notorious for the repetitiveness of names, so Herihor having a homonymous wife and mother would not be an impossible or unlikely scenario. If the Nodjmet from the Royal Cache was indeed the mother of Herihor, it follows that Hrere must have been the grandmother of Herihor instead of his mother(-in-law). In this position, she could well have been the wife of the High Priest Amenhotep. The debate on this issue is ongoing.

== The Late Ramesside Letters ==
One of the “Late Ramesside Letters”, letter no.2, written by the Scribe of the Necropolis Dhutmose, mentions Hrere as being in Elephantine during a military expedition of Piankh. Since this seemed to imply that Piankh had his grandmother accompany him on the first part of a dangerous campaign, M. Bierbrier suggested that besides a Hrere A, the mother of Nodjmet, there may have been a Hrere B, the daughter of Nodjmet and the wife of Piankh. The need for a second Hrere more or less ceased to exist when Karl Jansen-Winkeln proposed to put the pontificate of Piankh before that of Herihor. In his model there was only one Hrere, who was both the wife of Piankh and the mother-in-law of Herihor. Her title “who bore the Strong Bull” now became related to her being the mother of the High Priest Pinedjem, who is believed to have taken on semi-royal status later in his career.

== Bibliography ==
- E. A. Wallis Budge, Facsimiles of the Papyri of Hunefer, Anhai, Kerasher and Netchemet, London 1899
- Kenneth Kitchen, The Third Intermediate Period in Egypt (1100–650 BC), 1996, Aris & Phillips Limited, Warminster, ISBN 0-85668-298-5.
- Jeremy Goldberg, Was Piankh the son of Herihor after all?, GM 174 (2000), 49-58
- John Taylor, Nodjmet, Payankh and Herihor: The end of the New Kingdom reconsidered, in Christopher J. Eyre (ed), Proceedings of the Seventh International Congress of Egyptologists, Leuven 1998, 1143-1155
- E.F. Wente, Late Ramesside Letters, Chicago 1967 [SAOC 33]
- E.F. Wente, Letters from Ancient Egypt, Atlanta 1990.
