= Mutnedjmet (21st dynasty) =

- Great Royal Wife
- Burial: NRT III, Tanis
- Spouse: Psusennes I
- Issue: Amenemope (?)
- Dynasty: 21st Dynasty
- Father: Pinedjem I
- Mother: Duathathor-Henuttawy

t mwt nDm M Y1 t
Mutnedjmet
in hieroglyphs
Era: 3rd Intermediate Period
(1069–664 BC)

Mutnedjmet was an ancient Egyptian queen of the 21st Dynasty. She was the Great Royal Wife of her brother, Psusennes I.

== Family ==
=== Parents and Siblings ===
She was the daughter of High Priest of Amun Pinedjem I, who was the de facto ruler of Southern Egypt from 1070 BCE onwards, then proclaimed himself pharaoh in 1054 BCE. Her mother was Duathathor-Henuttawy, a daughter of Ramesses XI, last ruler of the 20th dynasty. Three of her brothers succeeded each other as High Priests of Amun and a sister, Maatkare became God's Wife of Amun.

=== Marriage and Children ===
It is generally assumed that she was the mother of Pharaoh Amenemope but, since genealogical evidence is lacking, this is primarily based on the fact that he succeeded to the throne. That she was the mother of the Crown Prince Ramesses-Ankhefenmut has been challenged and now seems unlikely.

Her titles were: King's Daughter of His Body; King's Sister; Great Royal Wife; Lady of the Two Lands; Second Prophet of Amun in Tanis.

== Death ==
=== Burial ===
She was buried in the tomb of her husband at Tanis, in a burial chamber parallel to his. Her burial chamber was later usurped by king Amenemope, but her name and some of her titles survived, mainly on the side of the sarcophagus which was turned to the wall. Pierre Montet believes that a depiction of Mutnedjmet on the wall of the burial chamber may have been usurped and reworked into a goddess when turning the scene into a depiction of Amenemope turned out to be too much work.

=== Mummy ===
The present whereabouts of her mummy remain unknown, but around 1980 some bronze ushabtis of her have surfaced on the antiquities market which suggests that her alternative burial (or a deposit of funerary equipment) may have been discovered. Several burial items are now in the Egyptian Museum in Cairo.

== Bibliography ==
- G.T. Martin, On some Shabtis of Mutnodjmet, wife of Psusennes I, in: BSEG 7 (1982), 73–77.
- P. Montet, La Nécropole Royale de Tanis à la Fin de 1945, in: ASAE 46 (1947), 311–322.
- P. Montet, Les Constructions et le Tombeau de Psousennès à Tanis, Paris (1951). La Nécropole de Tanis II.
