= Tentamun (20th dynasty) =

Ancient Egyptian queen consort

T n t i mn n B1
Tentamun
in hieroglyphs
Era: New Kingdom
(1550–1069 BC)

Tentamun ("she of Amun") was an ancient Egyptian queen, most likely the wife of Ramesses XI, last ruler of the 20th Dynasty. She is mentioned on the funerary papyrus of her daughter Duathathor-Henuttawy, who was the wife of Pinedjem I and probably the daughter of Ramesses XI. Tentamun's name is written in a cartouche.

== Family ==
A man named Nebseni is mentioned as her father on the funerary papyrus of her daughter. He was probably buried in the Theban tomb TT320.

Her children are:

- Duathathor-Henuttawy, who was the wife of Pinedjem I
- Another possible daughter is Tentamun, the wife of Smendes.
