= Tentamun (21st dynasty) =

Ancient Egyptian queen consort

U33 n t i mn n B1
Tentamun
in hieroglyphs
Era: New Kingdom
(1550–1069 BC)

Tentamun ("she of Amun") was an ancient Egyptian queen. She is likely to have been the daughter of Ramesses IX, the third last ruler of the 20th Dynasty. Her mother may have been another Tentamun, who was the mother of Ramesses's other daughter, Duathathor-Henttawy.

In the Story of Wenamun she is mentioned together with a Nesubanebded as residing in Tanis. Both are described as "organizers of the land". From this it is surmised that she was the wife of king Smendes, the first king of the 21st Dynasty.
