= Pinedjem I =

Ancient Egyptian high priest

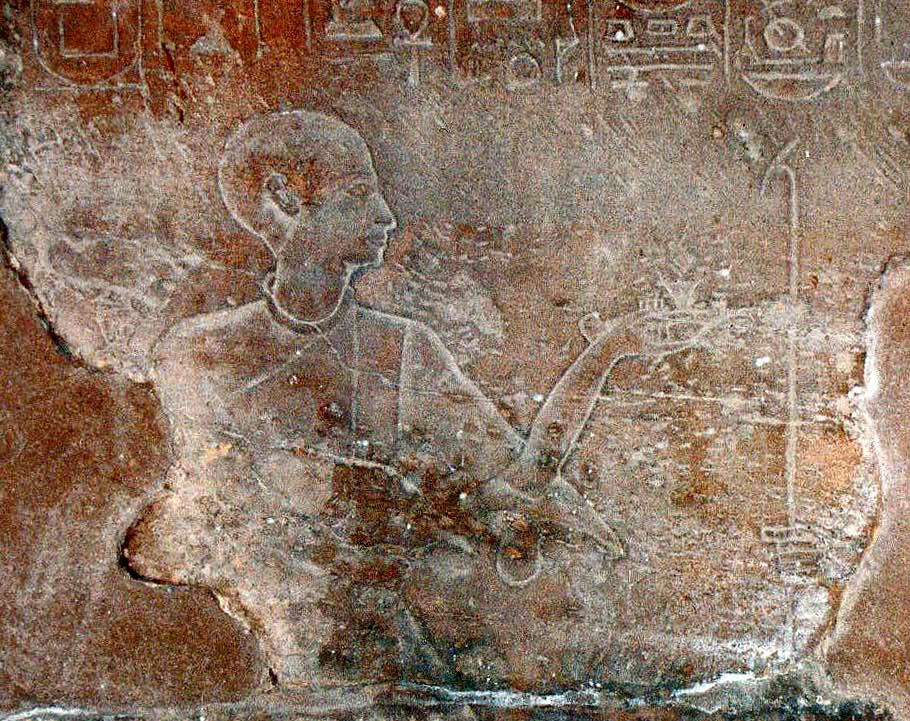
- Representation of Pinedjem I in the Temple of Khonsu, Karnak

High Priest of Amun and Pharaoh
- Reign: 1070–1055 (High Priest); 1054–1032 (pharaoh)
- Coregency: Smendes
- Predecessor: Piankh (only as High Priest) or Herihor
- Successor: Masaharta (only as High Priest)
Royal titulary
Horus name
Kanakht Meriamun
K3-nḫt-mrj-Jmn
Strong bull, beloved of Amun
| G5 | E2 D40 i mn n N36 |
Second Horus name:
Kanakht Khaemwaset
kȝ-nḫt-ḫˁ-m-wȝst
Strong bull who appears in Thebes
| G5 | E2 D40 N28 G17 R19 X1 O49 |
Prenomen
Kheperkhawra Setepenamun
ḫpr-ḫˁw-Rˁ-stp-n-Jmn
The manifestation of Ra appears, the chosen one of Amun

| M23 X1 L2 X1 | ra xpr N28 C12 stp n |
Nomen
Pinedjem Meriamun
pȝy-nḏm-mrj-Jmn
Pinedjem litt. The pleasant, beloved of Amun

| G39 N5 | i mn n mr pA Z4 nDm |
- Consorts: Duathathor-Henuttawy, Isetemkheb A, Tentnabehenut
- Children: Psusennes I, Masaharta, Djedkhonsuefankh, Menkheperre, Maatkare, Mutnedjmet, Henuttawy, Nesipaneferhor, Nauny
- Father: Piankh
- Mother: Hrere or Nodjmet
- Died: 1032 BC
- Dynasty: Parallel with the 21st Dynasty

Pinedjem I (died 1032 BC) was ruler of Southern Egypt as the High Priest of Amun at Thebes in Ancient Egypt from 1070 to 1055 BC, and nominal pharaoh alongside Smendes from 1054 to 1032 BC. He was the son of the High Priest Piankh. However, many Egyptologists today believe that the succession in the Amun priesthood actually ran from Piankh to Herihor to Pinedjem I.

== Reign ==
According to the new hypothesis regarding the succession of the Amun priesthood, Pinedjem I was too young to succeed to the High Priesthood of Amun after the death of Piankh. Herihor instead intervened to assume this office. After Herihor's death, Pinedjem I finally claimed this office which had once been held by his father Piankh. This interpretation is supported by the decorations from the Temple of Khonsu at Karnak where Herihor's wall reliefs here are immediately followed by those of Pinedjem I with no intervening phase for Piankh and also by the long career of Pinedjem I who served as High Priest of Amun and later as king at Thebes.

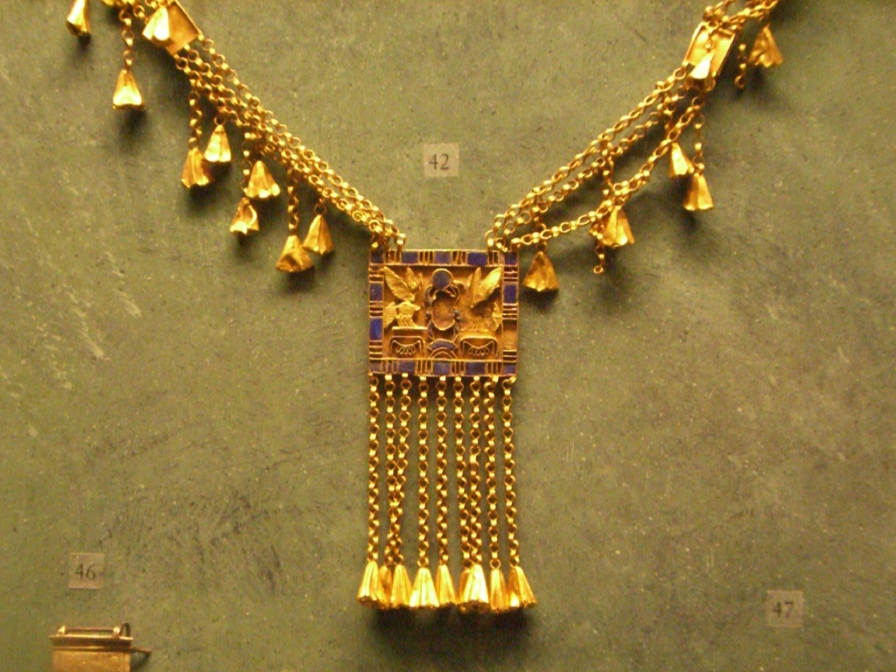
A pectoral of the High Priest Pinedjem I

He inherited a political and religious base of power at Thebes. Pinedjem strengthened his control over both Middle and Upper Egypt and asserted his kingdom's virtual independence from the Twenty-first Dynasty based at Tanis. He married Duathathor-Henuttawy, a daughter of Ramesses XI, to cement his relations with the other powerful families of the period. Their son, Psusennes I, went on to become Pharaoh at Tanis, thereby removing at a stroke the gap between the two families. In practice, however, the 21st dynasty kings and the Theban high priests were probably never very far apart politically since they respected each other's political autonomy.

Around Year 15 or 16 of Smendes, Pinedjem I proclaimed himself pharaoh over Upper Egypt, though years in Egypt were still counted according reign of Smendes, and his priestly role was inherited by his two sons Masaharta and Menkheperre. His daughter, Maatkare, held the position of Divine Adoratrice of Amun.

Pinedjem's mummy was found in the cache at Deir el-Bahri.

== Family ==
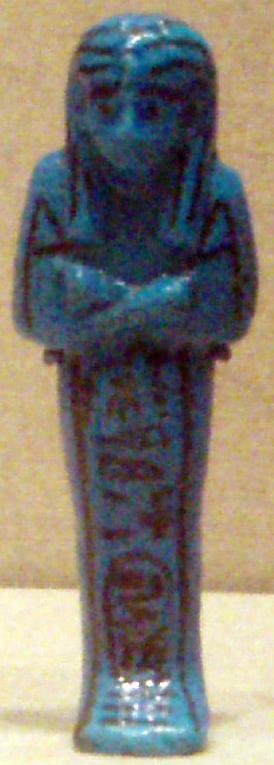
Ushabti of Pinedjem I, from Deir el-Bahari, now in Brooklyn Museum

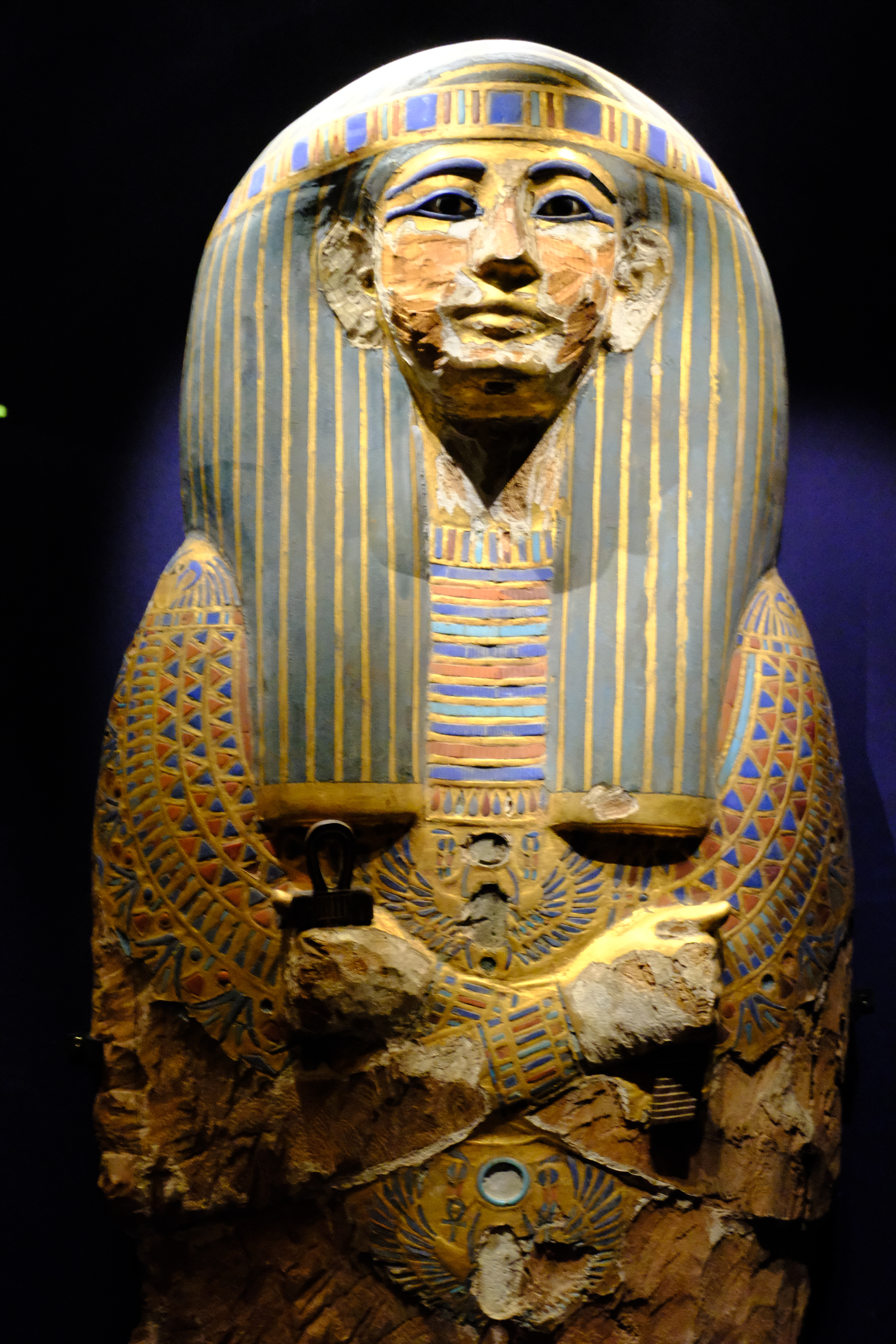
The Inner coffin lid of Pinedjem I

His parents Piankh and Nodjmet had several children; three brothers (Heqanefer, Heqamaat, Ankhefenmut) and one sister (Faienmut) of Pinedjem I are known. Three of his wives are known. Duathathor-Henuttawy, the daughter of Ramesses XI bore him several children: the future pharaoh Psusennes I, the God's Wife of Amun Maatkare, Princess Henuttawy and probably Queen Mutnedjmet, the wife of Psusennes.

Another wife was Isetemkheb, Singer of Amun. She is mentioned along with Pinedjem I on bricks found at el-Hiban. A possible third wife is Tentnabekhenu, who is mentioned on the funerary papyrus of her daughter Nauny. Nauny was buried at Thebes and is called a King's Daughter, thus it is likely that Pinedjem was her father.

Other than Psusennes, Pinedjem had four other sons, whose mother is unidentified, but one or more of them must have been born to Duathathor-Henuttawy: Masaharta, Djedkhonsuefankh, Menkheperre (all of whom became High Priests of Amun) and Nesipaneferhor, a God's Father (priest) of Amun, whose name replaced that of a son of Herihor in the Karnak temple of Khonsu.

== Bibliography ==
- Gabriella Dembitz, Inscriptions of the high priest Pinudjem I on the walls of the Eighteenth Dynasty Temple at Medinet Habu, in: E. Bechtold – A Gulyás – A. Hasznos (eds.): From Illahun to Djeme. Studies Presented to Professor Ulrich Luft. 31-41. BAR International series 2311. Oxford., 2011.
- Gabriella Dembitz, Une scène d'offrande de Maât au nom de Pinedjem Ier sur la statue colossale dite Ramsès II à Karnak. Karnak Varia §3, in: Cahiers de Karnak 15 (2015), 173-180.
