= Ramesses XI =

Egyptian pharaoh of the 20th dynasty

- Also written Ramses and Rameses
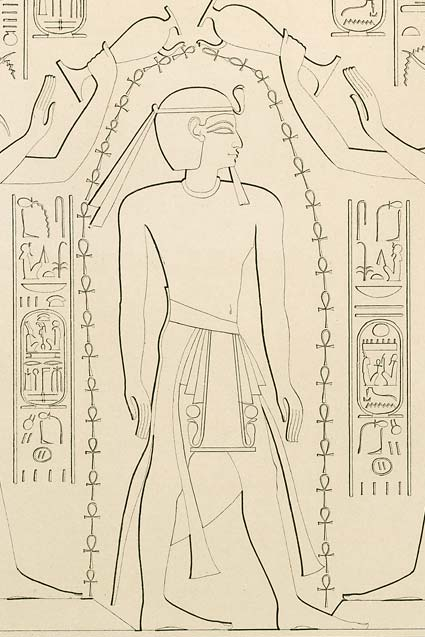
- Ramesses XI from the Temple of Khonsu in Karnak, drawn by Karl Richard Lepsius

Pharaoh
- Reign: 1106–1077/1073 BC
- Predecessor: Ramesses X
- Successor: Smendes (or Herihor or Ramesses XII?)
Royal titulary
Horus name
Kanakht Meryre
Kȝ-nḫt-mrj-Rˁ
Strong bull, beloved of Ra
G5	E2 D40 C2 U6
Nebty name
Userkhepesh Hedhefenu
Wsr-ḫpš hd-ḥfnw
He whose blow is powerful, he whose attacks are countless
G16	wsr s T16 O4 D46 D36 D40 I8 Z2
Golden Horus
Werpehtisankhtawy Ityankhwedjaseneb Seheribmaat Seheteptawy
Wr-pḥtj-s.ˁnḫ-tȝwy-jty-ˁnḫ-wḏ-snb-shr-ib-Mȝˁt-s.ḥtp-tȝwy
He whose power is great, he gives new life to the two lands,
life, prosperity, health, he reconciles the two lands under the majesty of Maat
G8
G36 D21 F22 X1 Z5 A24 S29 S34 N19 N23 N23 M17 A2 U33 M17 M17 A23 G7 S34 U28 S29 O4 D21 Y1 F34 U5 D36 Z1 H6 Y1 S29 R4 X1 Q3 Y1 N19 N23 N23
Prenomen
Menmaatre Setepenptah
Mn-mȝˁt-Rˁ-stp-n-Ptḥ
The justice of Ra is enduring, the chosen one of Ptah
M23 t L2 t < N5 Y5 C10 U21 N35 Q3 X1 V28 >
Nomen
Ramesses Khaemwaset Mereramun Netjerheqaiunu
Rˁ-msj-sw-Ḫȝ-m-Wȝst-mrj-Jmn-nṯr-ḥqȝ-Jwnw
Ra fashioned him, he appears in Waset, beloved of Amun, divine ruler of Iunu
G39 N5 < O34 O34 F31 C2 N28 R19 C12 U6 D21 D21 S38 R8 O28 >
Hieroglyphic variants:
G39 N5 < N28 C2 R19 C12 N36 D21 D21 F31 S38 R8 O28 O34 O34 >
G39 N5 < N28 C12 R19 C2 N36 S38 R8 O28 D21 D21 >
G39 N5 < N28 R19 N36 D21 D21 C12 C2 O34 O34 S38 R8 O28 >
G39 N5 < N5 F31 S29 S29 N28 Aa15 R19 U7 D21 D21 M17 Y5 N35 R8 S38 O28 Z1 G7 V1 V1 V1 >
- Consort: Tentamun
- Children: Duathathor-Henuttawy?, Tentamun?, Nodjmet?, Ramesses XII?
- Father: Ramesses X?
- Died: 1077 or 1073 BC
- Burial: KV4 (intended, never used)
- Dynasty: 20th Dynasty

Menmaatre Ramesses XI (also written Ramses and Rameses) was a pharaoh who reigned from 1106 BC to somewhere between 1078 BC and 1068 BC and is generally considered the tenth and final pharaoh of the Twentieth Dynasty of Egypt and as such, the last king of the New Kingdom period. He ruled Egypt for at least 29 years although some Egyptologists think he could have ruled for as long as slightly more than 30 years. The latter figure would be up to 2 years beyond this king's highest known date of Year 10 of the wḥm-mswt ("Renaissance") era or Year 28 of his reign. One scholar, Ad Thijs, has suggested that Ramesses XI could even have reigned as long as 33 years.

It is believed that Ramesses ruled into his Year 29 since a graffito records that the general and High Priest of Amun Piankh returned to Thebes from Nubia on III Shemu day 23—or just 3 days into what would have been the start of Ramesses XI's 29th regnal year. Piankh is known to have campaigned in Nubia during Year 28 of Ramesses XI's reign (or Year 10 of the wḥm-mswt) and would have returned home to Egypt in the following year.

== Background ==
Ramesses XI was once thought to be the son of Ramesses X by Queen Tyti who was a King's Mother, King's Wife and King's Daughter in her titles. However, recent scholarly research into certain copies of parts of the Harris papyrus (or Papyrus BM EA 10052)—collected by Anthony Harris—which discusses a harem conspiracy against Ramesses III—reveals that Tyti was a queen of Ramesses III instead. Hence, Ramesses XI's mother was not Tyti and although he could have been a son of his predecessor, this is not established either. Ramesses XI is believed to have married Tentamun, the daughter of Nebseny, with whom he is assumed to have fathered Duathathor-Henuttawy—the future wife of the high priest Pinedjem I. Ramesses XI may have had another daughter named Tentamun who became king Smendes' future wife in the next dynasty. These connections, however, remain tentative.

Sometime during his reign, the High Priest of Amun, Amenhotep, was ousted from office by Pinehesy, the Viceroy of Kush who for some time took control of the Thebais. Although this “suppression of the High Priest of Amun” used to be dated quite early in the reign (prior to year 9 of the reign), recently the communis opinio has changed to the view that it took place only shortly before the start of the wḥm-mswt or "Renaissance," an era which was inaugurated in regnal Year 19, probably to stress the return of normal conditions following the coup of Pinehesy.

== Accession date ==
Ramesses XI is usually assigned an accession date of III shemu 20 (third month of the Summer season, day 20) However, a later Twentieth Dynasty papyrus fragment from Deir el-Medina published in 2023 by the Egyptologist Robert J. Demarée refers to a partial date of Year 4, III month of Akhet together with a change to Year 1, IV month of Akhet. Although both kings are unnamed, the papyrus is strongly suggested by Demarée to refer to the reigns of Ramesses X and his successor Ramesses XI. If confirmed, this would mean that Ramesses XI actually had his accession date between the III and IV month of Akhet rather than III Shemu 20 as has been assumed.

Demarée stresses in his 2023 study that the sources which support an accession date of III Shemu day 20 for Ramesses XI are hardly conclusive:

The two key documents quoted are P. Turin Cat. 1888 + Cat. 2095 and P. Ashmolean Museum 1945.96, the Adoption Papyrus. The first is a journal text from the reign of Ramesses XI containing a series of dates spread over several months, with only one full date: Year 18 IV Šmw Day 14 or 24. Considering this as certain indication of a recent year change is speculation and beyond proof. The second document is the famous Adoption Papyrus, P. Ashmolean Museum 1945.96. In the words of its first editor, Alan Gardiner, the opening lines of this document record, on III Šmw Day 20, a visit by Ramesses XI to the Temple of Karnak to announce his accession to the god Amun, followed by an offering to this deity. The text clearly only speaks of informing the god Amun of the accession of the king – sr.t xa n nTr pn Sps n Imn. Contrary to the opinion of the scholars who first posited III Šmw Day 20 as the coronation date, the accession of the king did not take place on that day at Karnak. This ceremony certainly had already taken place earlier either in the [Royal] Delta residence or at Memphis, and as usual the king later had to pay visits to other state gods to inform them of his accession.

== The wḥm-mswt ("Renaissance") era ==
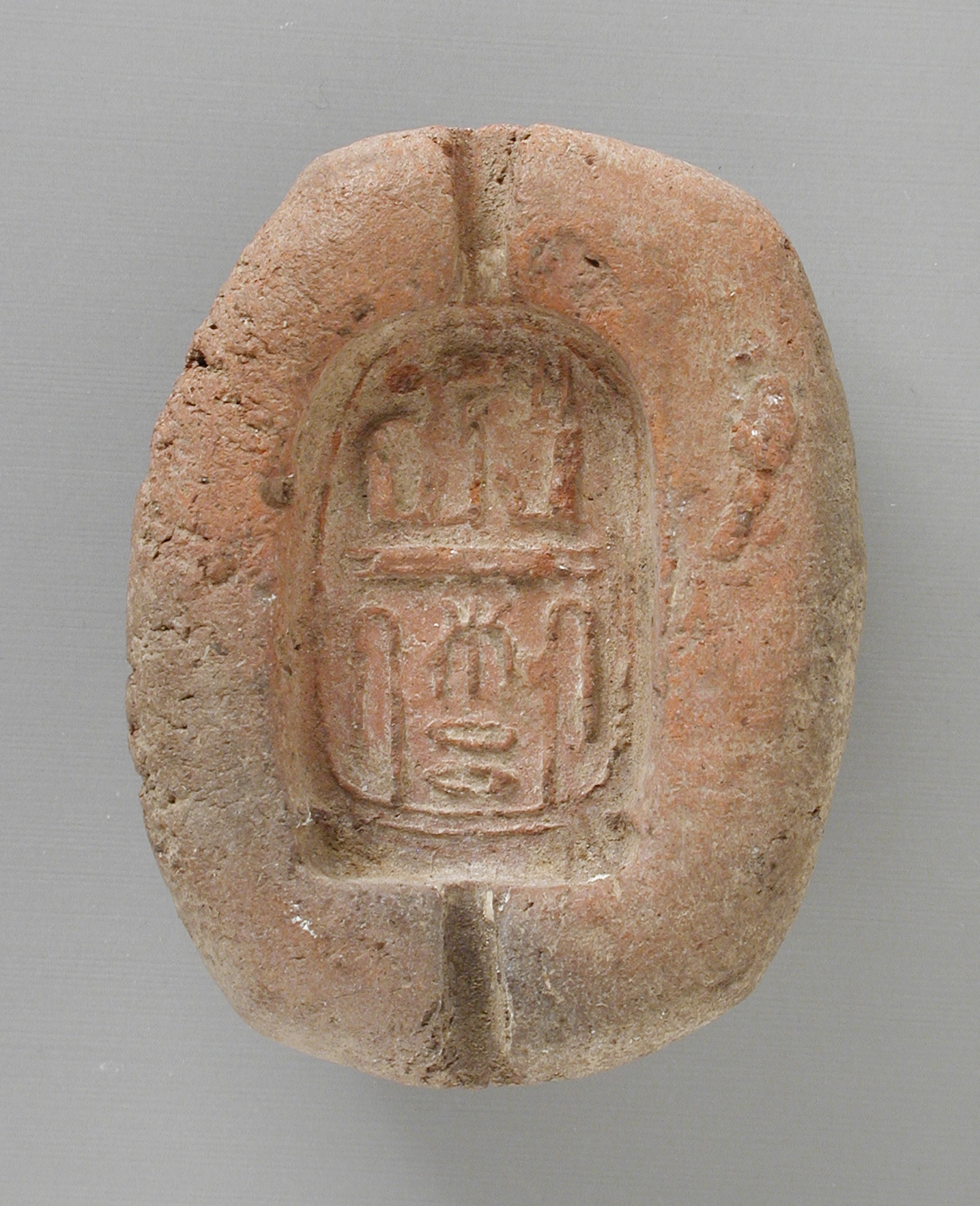
Mold with the name of Ramesses XI or IX at LACMA

Ramesses XI's reign is notable for a large number of important papyri that have been discovered, including the Adoption Papyrus, which mentions regnal years 1 and 18 of his reign; Pap. B.M. 10052, Pap. Mayer A, Pap. B.M. 10403 and Pap. B.M. 10383 (the last four containing the accounts of tomb-robbery trials conducted during the first two years of the wḥm-mswt); Pap. Ambras (containing a list of documents which were repurchased in year 6 of the wḥm-mswt, after having been stolen from some temple archive, most probably during the chaotic period of the suppression of the High Priest of Amun Amenhotep); the Turin Taxation Papyrus, of an unspecified year 12; Pap. B.M. 10068, which includes on its verso two lists, called the House-list (from an unspecified year 12) and the Srmt-list (undated, but slightly later than the Houselist); Pap. B.M. 9997, of an unspecified year 14 and 15; and an entire series of Late Ramesside Letters written by -among others- the scribes of the Necropolis Dhutmose, Butehamun, and the High Priest Piankh. Late Ramesside Letter no. 9 establishes that the wḥm-mswt period lasted into a 10th year (which more or less equates year 28 proper of Ramesses XI).

Pinehesy was subsequently designated as an enemy in several papyri from year 1 and 2 of the wḥm-mswt (equaling year 19 and 20 proper of Ramesses XI) where his name was consistently associated "by the nḏs [or] ('bad') bird as its determinative" in these papyri.

How exactly the anarchic period of the Suppression was ended and who ultimately forced Pinehesy out of Thebes is unknown, due to a lack of explicit sources. However, it seems that Pinehesy retreated to Nubia and succeeded in maintaining some sort of powerbase there for over a decade. In year 10 of the wḥm-mswt the then general and High Priest Piankh goes on an expedition to Nubia to "meet Pinehesy". Although it is often postulated that it was the aim of this campaign to fight the former Viceroy, this is by no means certain. The sources are actually ambiguous on this point and the political climate may well have changed over the years. There is some evidence that at this time Piankh may no longer have been a loyal servant of Ramesses XI, which allows for the possibility that he was secretly negotiating with Pinehesy, possibly even plotting against the reigning king. Edward Wente wrote: "One has the impression that the viceroy and his Nubian troops were loyalists, for the remarks made by his opponent Piankh in letter No. 301 are quite disparaging of the pharaoh, Ramesses XI." In this letter, better known as LRL no. 21, Piankh remarks:

As for Pharaoh, l.p.h., how shall he reach this land? And of whom is Pharaoh, l.p.h., superior still?

In the same letter and two others (LRL no. 34 and no. 35) Piankh gives the order to the Scribe of the Necropolis Tjaroy (=Dhutmose), the lady Nodjmet and a certain Payshuuben to secretly arrest and question two Medjay policemen about certain things they had apparently said:

If they find out that (it is) true, you shall place them (in) two baskets and (they) shall be thrown (into) this water by night. But do not let anybody in the land find out.

Whereas Piankh would probably have had the authority to have people executed, it is noteworthy that his correspondents are explicitly urged to keep the matter secret. It has been argued that, given Piankh's supreme position at the time, the secrecy can only have concerned the king. If this is correct, it follows that the political situation of the time must have been very complex, with Piankh possibly acting on some hidden agenda. Unfortunately, due to the very limited nature of the sources, the exact relationships between the three main protagonists, Piankh, Pinehesy and Ramesses XI remain far from clear. Some scholars believe that the Nubian campaign was part of an ongoing power struggle between the High Priest of Amun and the Viceroy of Kush However, it is equally possible that Piankh came to the rescue of Pinehesy against some common enemy. The verb often translated as "to attack (Pinehesy)" only means "to meet/ to go to". In fact, neither the aim of the expedition nor its outcome are beyond doubt. The issue is further complicated by the ongoing debate about [1] the order of High Priests (either Herihor before Piankh or Piankh before Herihor) and [2] the correct ascription (either to the pre-Renaissance period or to the wḥm-mswt itself) of several documents from the reign of Ramesses XI.

At present, Ad Thijs' suggestion that Pinehesy was apparently rehabilitated by Ramesses XI in year 11 or 12 of the wḥm-mswt has only been explicitly accepted by the Egyptologist Aidan Dodson.

== Length of reign ==
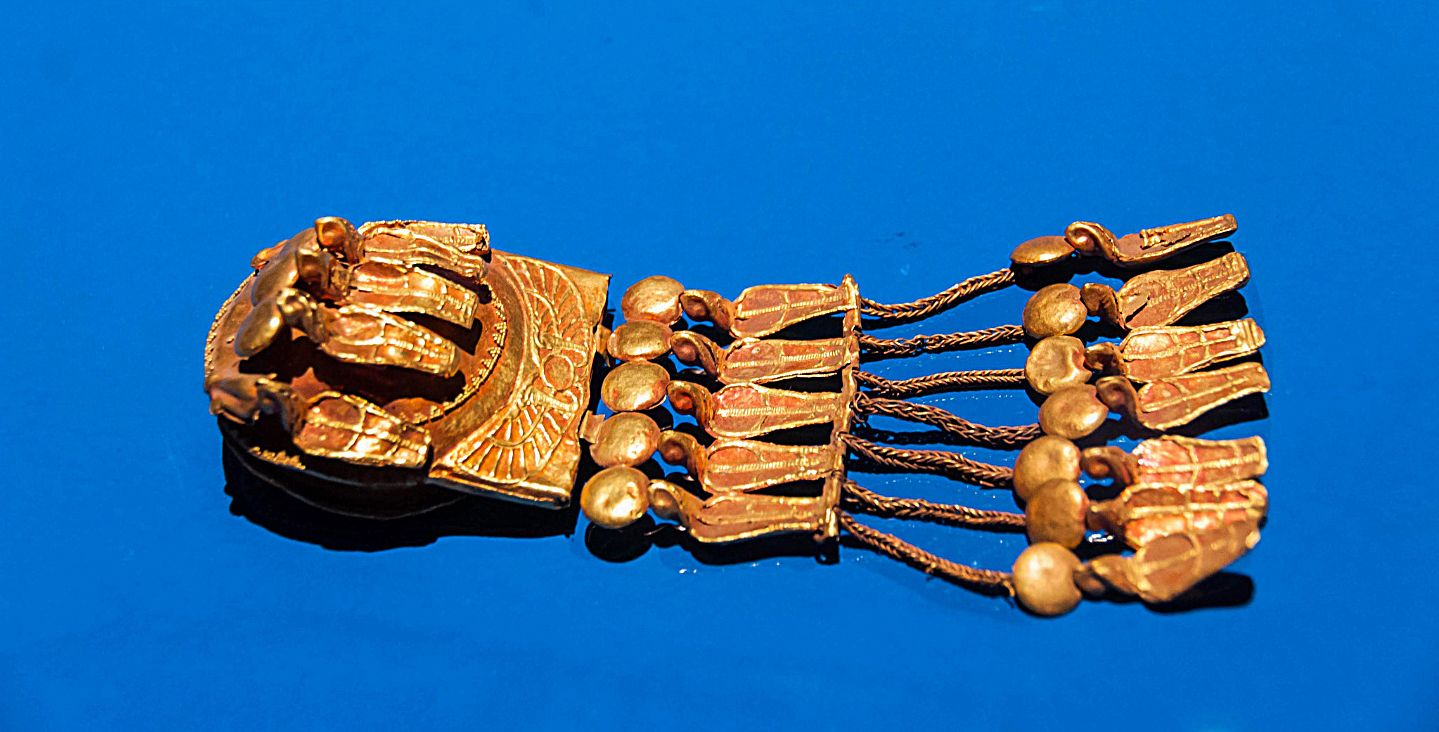
A Gold Earring which bears the cartouche of Ramesses XI.

Neither the length of the Renaissance nor the ascription of certain documents from the reign of Ramesses XI are beyond dispute. At present, Thijs' proposal that Papyrus BM 10054 dates to the wḥm-mswt has been confirmed by other scholars such as Jürgen von Beckerath and Annie Gasse, who studied several newly discovered fragments belonging to this document. Consequently, it would appear that Ramesses XI's highest undisputed date is presently Year 11 of the wḥm-mswt (or Year 29 proper) of his reign, when Piankh's Nubian campaign terminated which means that the pharaoh had a minimum reign of 29 years when he died—-which can perhaps be extended to 30 years due to the "gap between the beginning of Dynasty 21 and the reign of Ramesses XI," with 33 years being hypothetical. Krauss and Warburton specifically write that due to the existence of this time gap,

Egyptologists generally concede that his reign could have ended 1 or 2 years later than year 10 of the wḥm-mswt era = regnal year 28.

Aidan Dodson, however, allows for a 'year 15' of the wḥm-mswt on the basis of P. BM 9997.

Either during the reign of Ramesses XI or shortly afterwards, the workmen village of Deir El Medina was abandoned, apparently because the Royal Necropolis was shifted northward to Tanis and there was no further need for their services at Thebes.

== Late New Kingdom chronology of Ramesses XI ==
The conventional Egyptian chronology view is that Ramesses XI had an independent reign of between 29 and 30 or 33 full years between Ramesses X and Smendes. Thijs' separate proposal that the first 17 years of Ramesses XI's reign were entirely contemporary with the reigns of Ramesses IX (Years 5-19) and Ramesses X (Years 1-3) is not currently accepted by most Egyptologists except Aidan Dodson in his 2012 book Afterglow of Empire.

== Death and burial ==
Ramesses XI died under unknown circumstances. While he had a tomb prepared for himself in the Valley of the Kings (KV4), it was left unfinished and only partly decorated since Ramesses XI instead arranged to have himself buried away from Thebes, possibly near Memphis or in Pi-Ramesses. This pharaoh's tomb, however, includes some unusual features, including four rectangular, rather than square, pillars in its burial chamber and an extremely deep central burial shaft– at over 30 feet or 10 metres long– which was perhaps designed as an additional security device to prevent tomb robbery. During the 21st dynasty, under the reign of the High Priest of Thebes, Pinedjem I, Ramesses XI's tomb was used as a workshop for processing funerary materials from the burials of Hatshepsut, Thutmose III and perhaps Thutmose I. Ramesses XI's tomb has stood open since antiquity and was used as a dwelling by the Copts.

== Succession ==
Most Egyptologists assume that Ramesses XI was succeeded on the throne by Smendes, as the first Lower Egyptian king of the Twenty-first Dynasty. However, the now widely accepted reversal of the previous order of the High Priests of Amun Herihor–Piankh by Karl Jansen-Winkeln has created the problem of a likely unidentified king reigning between Ramesses XI and Smendes, neither of whom can be unproblematically identified as the monarch in whose regnal Years 5 and 6 are attested activities of the High Priest Herihor. Ad Thijs attempted to address the problem by splitting the High Priest and subsequently King Pinedjem I into two persons and identifying King Pinedjem with the unnamed monarch, Rolf Krauss proposed that the reign intervening between those of Ramesses XI and Smendes belonged to Herihor himself, while Ian Mladjov proposed identifying the unnamed monarch with an unplaced king, Usermaatre-heqawast Rameses-mereramun, as Ramesses XII. The splitting up of the High Priest and later King Pinedjem into two distinct individuals is considered implausible, Krauss' solution, otherwise plausible, allows the paradox of Herihor using his own regnal years without claiming a royal title, while Mladjov's solution probably requires assuming a temporary interruption of work under the High Priest Herihor at the Temple of Khonsu, resuming only after he became king following the postulated Ramesses XII. Whatever the precise circumstances, Herihor and Smendes eventually assumed the kingship, founding the Twenty-first Dynasty, with its new royal capital at Tanis, while Middle and Upper Egypt, effectively passed into the hands of the High Priests of Amun at Thebes.

== Bibliography ==
- Aldred, Cyril 1979, "More Light on the Ramesside Tomb Robberies", in: J. Ruffle, G.A. Gaballa & K.A.. Kitchen (eds), Glimpses of Ancient Egypt, (Festschrift Fairman), Warminster: 92-99.
- Aston, David 2020, "The Third Intermediate Period," Chapter 32 in: Ian Shaw & Elizabeth Bloxam, eds., The Oxford Handbook of Egyptology, Oxford University Press: Oxford: 990-1044.
- Baker, Darrell D. 2008 The Encyclopedia of the Egyptian Pharaohs, Volume I: Predynastic to the Twentieth Dynasty (3300–1069 BC), Bannerstone Press, London, ISBN 978-1-905299-37-9, S. 334–336.
- Beckerath, Jürgen von 1999, Handbuch der ägyptischen Königsnamen, Zabern: Mainz.
- Cannuyer, Christian 1993, Encore la Date de l'accession au Thrône de Ramsès XI, Göttinger Miszellen 132: 19-20.
- Collier, Mark, Aidan Dodson, and Gottfried Hamernik 2010, "P. BM 10052, Anthony Harris and Queen Tyti", Journal of Egyptian Archaeology 96: 242-247 online
- Demarée, Robert J. (2023). "Two Papyrus Fragments with Historically Relevant Data". Rivista del Museo Egizio. 7. doi:10.29353/rime.2023.5078.
- Dodson, Aidan 2012, Afterglow of Empire, Egypt from the Fall of the New Kingdom to the Saite Renaissance, AUC Press.
- Dodson, Aidan and Dyan Hilton 2004, The Complete Royal Families of Ancient Egypt, Thames & Hudson.
- Gasse, Annie 2001, "Panakhemipet et ses complices (À propos du papyrus BM EA 10054, R° 2, 1–5)", Journal of Egyptian Archaeology 87 (2001): 81-92.
- Hornung, Erik, Rolf Krauss and David Warburton, eds., 2006: Handbook of Ancient Egyptian Chronology, Brill: Leiden.
- Jansen-Winkeln, Karl 1992, "Das Ende des Neuen Reiches," Zeitschrift für Ägyptische Sprache und Altertumskunde 119: 22-37.
- Kitchen, Kenneth A. 1995, The Third Intermediate Period in Egypt (1100–650 BC), 3rd ed., Aris & Phillips: Warminster.
- Krauss, Rolf 2015, "Egyptian Chronology: Ramesses II through Shoshenq III, with analysis of the lunar dates of Thutmoses III," Ägypten und Levante 25: 335-382.
- Mladjov, Ian 2017, "The Transition between the Twentieth and Twenty-First Dynasties Revisited," Birmingham Egyptology Journal 5: 1-23. online .
- Niwiński, Andrzej 1992, in: I. Gamer-Wallert & W. Helck (eds), Gegengabe (Festschrift Emma Brunner-Traut), Tübingen: 257-258.
- Ohlhafer, Klaus 1993, Zum Thronbesteigungsdatum Ramses' XI. und zur Abfolge der Grabräuberpapyri aus Jahr 1 und 2 whm-mswt, Göttinger Miszellen 135: 59-72.
- Palmer, Jennifer 2014, "The High Priests of Amun at the End of the Twentieth Dynasty," Birmingham Egyptology Journal 2: 1-22. online
- Reeves, Nicholas and Richard H. Wilkinson 1996, The Complete Valley of the Kings, Thames & Hudson Ltd.
- Ridealgh, Kim 2014, A Tale of Semantics and Suppressions: Reinterpreting Papyrus Mayer A and the So-called 'War of the High Priest' during the Reign of Ramesses XI, Studien zur altägyptische Kultur 43, 359-373.
- Thijs, Ad 1999, "Reconsidering the End of the Twentieth Dynasty. Part III: Some Hitherto Unrecognised Documents from the Whm Mswt," Göttinger Miszellen 173: 175-192.
- Thijs, Ad 2000, "Reconsidering the End of the Twentieth Dynasty Part V, P. Ambras as an advocate of a shorter chronology," Göttinger Miszellen 179: 69-83.
- Thijs, Ad 2003, "The Troubled Careers of Amenhotep and Panehsy: The High Priest of Amun and the Viceroy of Kush under the Last Ramessides," Studien zur altägyptische Kultur 31: 289-306.
- Thijs, Ad 2004, "Pap. Turin 2018, the journeys of the scribe Dhutmose and the career of the Chief Workman Bekenmut," Göttinger Miszellen 199: 79-88.
- Thijs, Ad 2005, "In Search of King Herihor and the Penultimate Ruler of the 20th Dynasty," Zeitschrift für Ägyptische Sprache und Altertumskunde 132: 73-91.
- Thijs, Ad 2006, "I was thrown out from my city—Fecht's views on Pap. Pushkin 127 in a new light," Studien zur altägyptische Kultur 35: 307-326.
- Thijs, Ad 2014, "Once More, the Length of the Ramesside Renaissance," Göttinger Miszellen 240: 69-81.
- Thijs, Ad 2018, "Some observations on the Tomb-Robbery Papyri", in: A.I. Blöbaum, M. Eaton-Krauss, A. Wüthrich (eds), Pérégrinations avec Erhart Graefe, Festschrift zu seinem 75. Geburtstag (= Ägypten und Altes Testament 87): 519-536.
- Török, László 1997, The Kingdom of Kush: Handbook of the Napatan-Meriotic Civilization, Brill: Leiden.
- Wente, Edward F. 1966, "The Suppression of the High Priest Amenhotep," Journal of Near Eastern Studies 25: 73-87.
- Wente, Edward F. 1967, Late Ramesside Letters (= Studies in Ancient Oriental Civilization (SAOC)) 33, University of Chicago Press, Chicago.
- Wente, Edward F. 1990, Letters from Ancient Egypt, Atlanta.
