= Year 400 Stela =

Ancient Egyptian stele

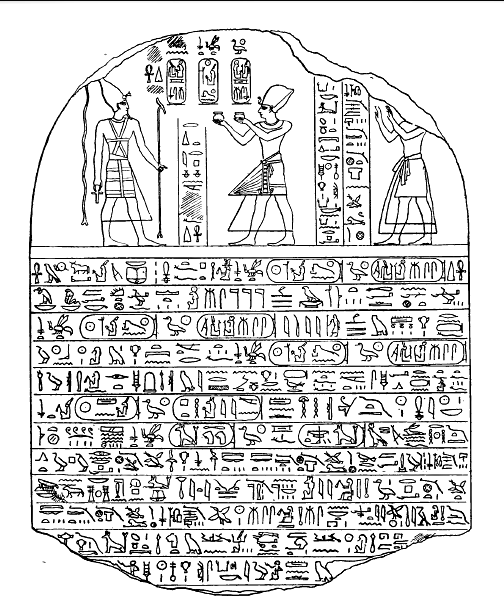
- A drawing of the Year 400 Stela
- Material: granite
- Writing: Ancient Egyptian hieroglyphs
- Created: 13th century BCE
- Discovered: Tanis
- Discovered by: Auguste Mariette (1863), Pierre Montet (1933)
- Present location: Cairo Museum

The Year 400 Stela, or Stela of Year 400, is an ancient Egyptian stela issued in the 13th century BCE. The meaning of this stela could be clearer, but it is generally assumed that it celebrates the 400th anniversary of some event related to the deity Seth.

== History and description ==
The stela was unearthed in 1863 by Auguste Mariette, who was excavating within the great temple at Tanis. Mariette copied and then reburied the stela, which was rediscovered by Pierre Montet in 1933 and then moved in the Cairo Museum.

The incomplete stela was made during the reign of Ramesses II of the 19th Dynasty; this pharaoh appears in the lunette while offering wine jars to Seth, whose name was erased when this deity was demonised in later times. Behind the pharaoh stands an official named Seti, the author of the stela.

The inscription on the lower register says that Seti, son of Paramessu and Tia, came to worship Seth and commemorate this event by issuing the granite stela; curiously, and with the approval of Ramesses II, Seti dated the stela to the “Year 400, fourth day of the fourth month of the Season of the Inundation” of a pharaoh named Aapehtiseth Nubti (“Great is the strength of Seth, he of Ombos”):

< E20 O29 F9 F9 >< t S13 Z4 E20 >

== Interpretation ==
Since the discovery it was obvious that the Year 400 of Nubti was not a regnal year, but rather a sort of anniversary. Giving the 400-years interval and the explicit references to the god Seth, Nubti was initially considered an otherwise unattested Hyksos ruler. Thus, it was suggested that the 400th anniversary could refer to an important event such as the construction of a temple of Seth, or, more generally, to the beginning of a new era. The discovery also fueled the now-disproven hypothesis that Tanis had to be identified with the ancient Hyksos capital Avaris, and that the stela may have been a commemoration of the arrival of the Hyksos.

In more modern times, however, scholars realized that the official Seti is none other than Ramesses' father Seti I in his early career, and the earlier king Nubti was not a real king, but rather Seth himself provided with fictitious royal titles. Going 400 years back before the period suggested by the stela (most likely when Seti was an official under king Horemheb), gives a datation of the celebrated event of around 1730–1720 BCE.
