= Wendjebauendjed =

Ancient Egyptian general

- General and army leader, high priest of Khonsu
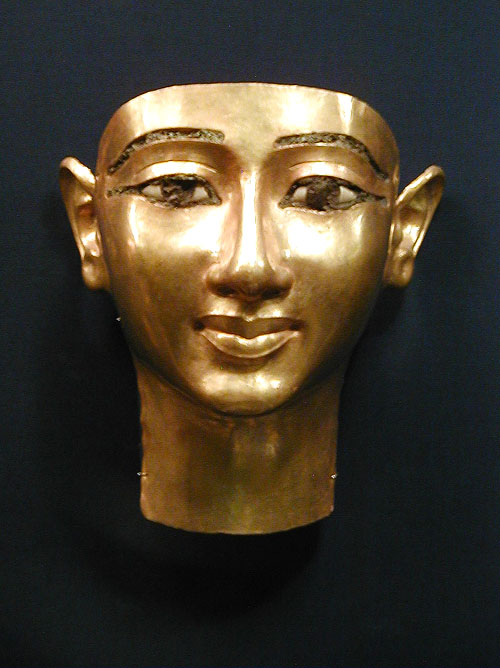
- Mummy mask of Wendjebauendjed, Cairo Museum
Egyptian name
wn n DbA mDAt Z2 n Dd t niwtWn ḏbȝw n ḏd
- Dynasty: 21st Dynasty
- Pharaoh: Psusennes I
- Burial: Tanis, NRT III

Wendjebauendjed was an ancient Egyptian general, high dignitary and high priest during the reign of pharaoh Psusennes I of the 21st Dynasty. He is mainly known for his intact tomb found by Pierre Montet inside the royal necropolis of Tanis (NRT III) in a chamber of Psusennes I's tomb in 1946.

== Biography ==
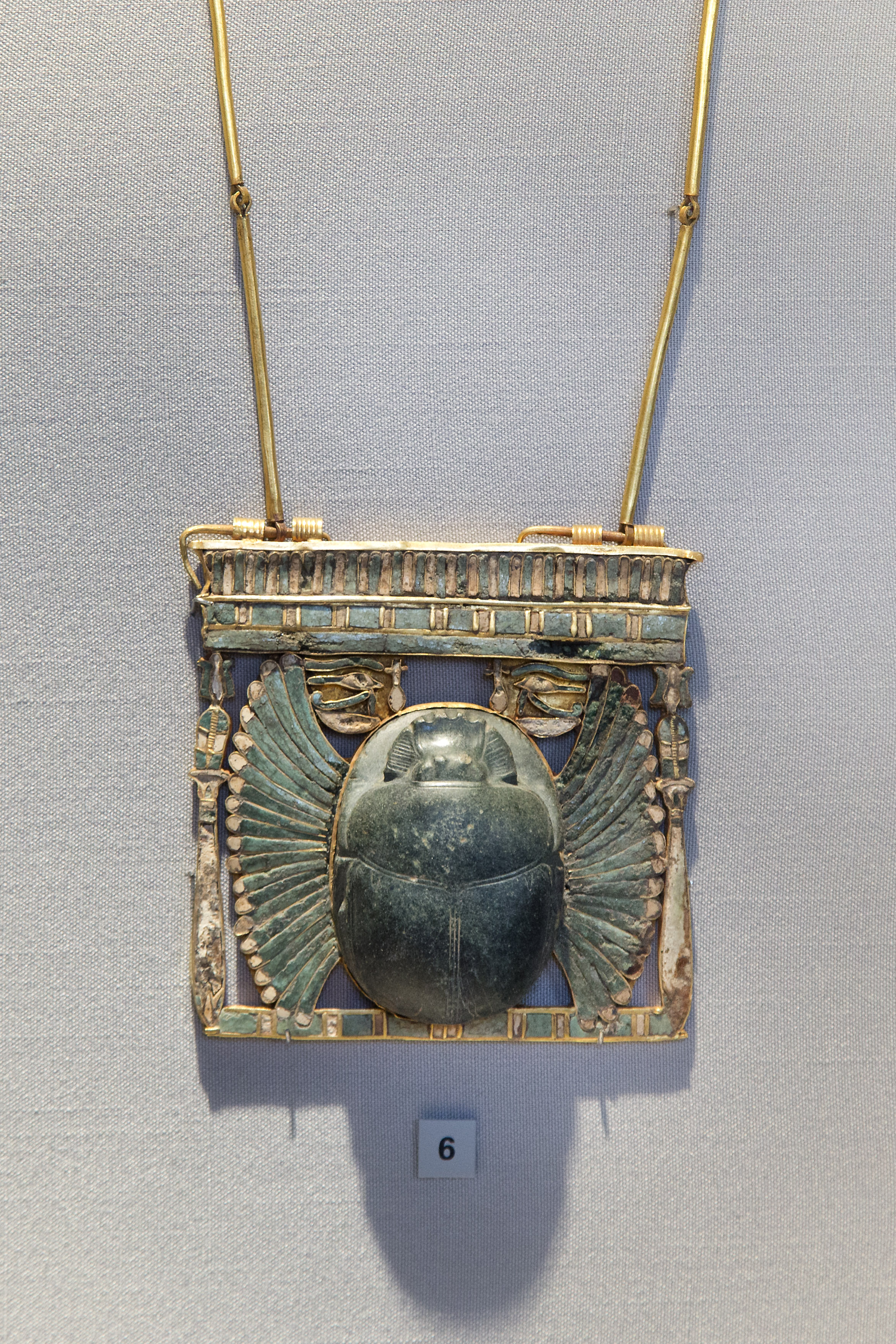
Wendjebauendjed's pectoral from his tomb

Nothing is known about his life other than his occupations: Wendjebauendjed held a list of military, administrative and religious titles, such as Hereditary prince, count, Seal-bearer of the King of Lower Egypt, God's father, General and Army leader, High steward (later High priest) of Khonsu, Priest of "Osiris lord of Mendes", Superintendent of the Prophets of all the gods and Superintendent of the Sole Friend.
The fact that Wendjebauendjed held such important offices granted him the great honor to be buried in the royal necropolis even though he was not a royal personage. According to one of his titles, it is possible that he was a native of Mendes (Djedet). His mummified remains shows that he was perhaps of Nubian descent and that he died around his fifties.

== Discovery ==
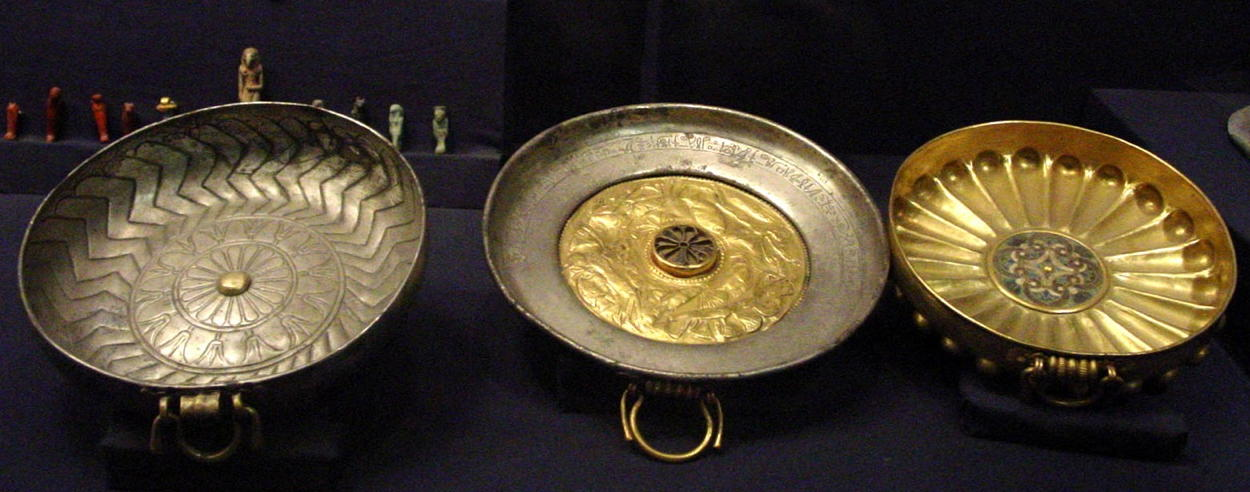
Three gold and silver bowls from Wendjebauendjed's tomb

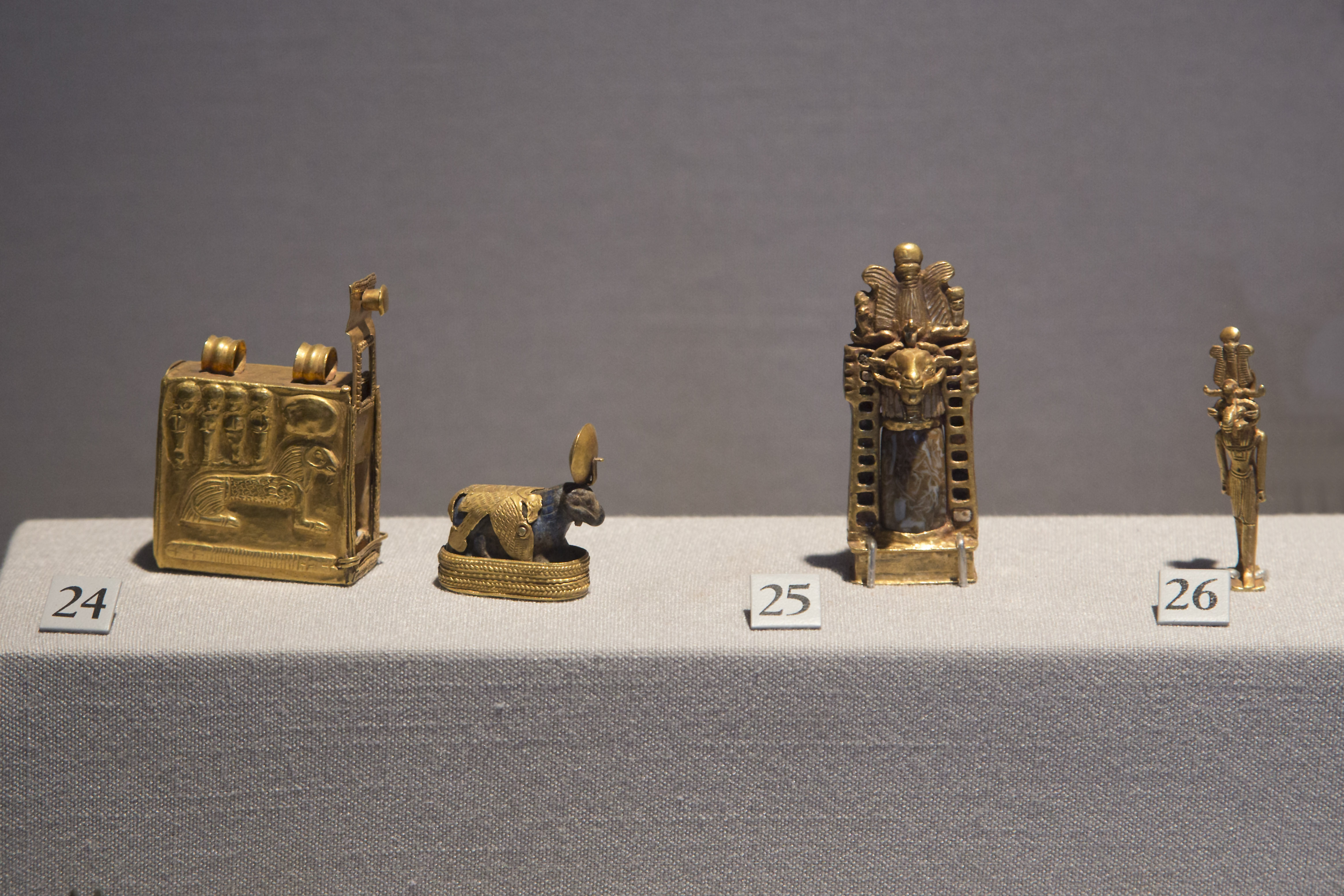
Ram headed amulets from Wendjebauendjed's tomb.

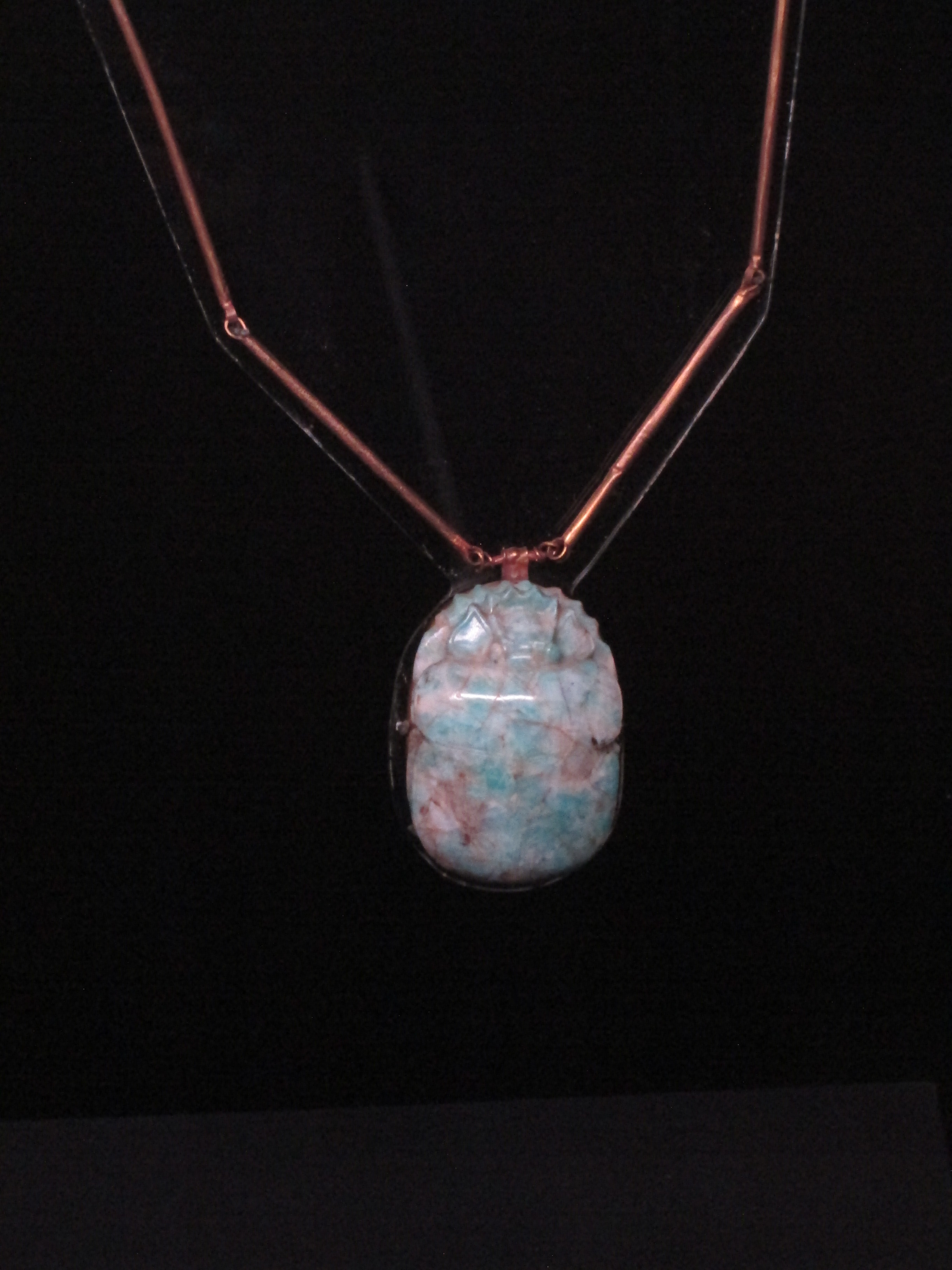
Wendjebauendjed's heart scarab

The name Wendjebauendjed was initially found by Pierre Montet and Georges Goyon in 1939 carved on some statuettes and ushabtis found inside the newly discovered burial chamber of Shoshenq II in Psusennes I's tomb. A year later, Montet discovered the burial chamber of Psusennes I where he found a golden hilt which belonged to Wendjebauendjed, placed on the king's sarcophagus.

After World War II, Montet and Goyon resumed the excavations and, on 13 February 1946, they discovered a new, undisturbed burial chamber inside the same necropolis. A reused granite anthropoid sarcophagus, originally belonging to a Third priest of Amun called Amenhotep and datable to the 19th Dynasty, was found inside. The new owner was the same Wendjebauendjed named on the objects recovered from the nearby tombs before the war. For him the sarcophagus was covered by gold leaf, and inside it was a painted and gilded wooden coffin which in turn contained a silver coffin, both poorly preserved. Wendjebauendjed's face was covered by a golden mummy mask, and many other jewelry pieces were found inside the sarcophagus such as pectorals, rings, bracelets and gold statuettes; particularly remarkable are three fine bowls made from gold and silver, and a lapis lazuli statuette of Amun in his ram form. Outside the sarcophagus were also found many ushabtis and Wendjebauendjed's four canopic jars. All the funerary equipment is now in the Egyptian Museum in Cairo.

== Bibliography ==
- Georges Goyon, La Découverte des trésors de Tanis, Éditions Perséa, 1987, ISBN 978-2-906427-01-3, pp. 166–170.
- Henri Stierlin, Christiane Ziegler: Tanis: Vergessene Schätze der Pharaonen. Hirmer, München 1987, ISBN 3-7774-4460-X, p. 80.
