= Zoan =

City of Egypt in the eastern Nile Delta, mentioned in the Hebrew bible

According to the Hebrew Bible, Zoan (Biblical Hebrew: צֹועַן Ṣōʿan) was a city of Egypt in the eastern Nile Delta. Book of Numbers 13:22 says that it was built seven years after Hebron was built. Psalm 78:12,43 identifies the "field of Zoan" as the location where Moses performed miracles before a biblical Pharaoh to persuade him to release the Israelites from his service. The city is also mentioned in Book of Isaiah 19:11, 13, Isaiah 30:4 and Book of Ezekiel 30:14.

The Greek Septuagint in all of these verses uses the Greek name Tánis (Greek: Τάνις). Both Tanis and Tso'an are ultimately derived from the Ancient Egyptian name for Tanis, ḏꜥn.t (Bohairic Coptic ϫⲁⲛⲓ; Sahidic Coptic ϫⲁⲁⲛⲉ; Modern Arabic صان Ṣan).
