= Auguste Mariette =

French archaeologist and Egyptologist (1821–1881)

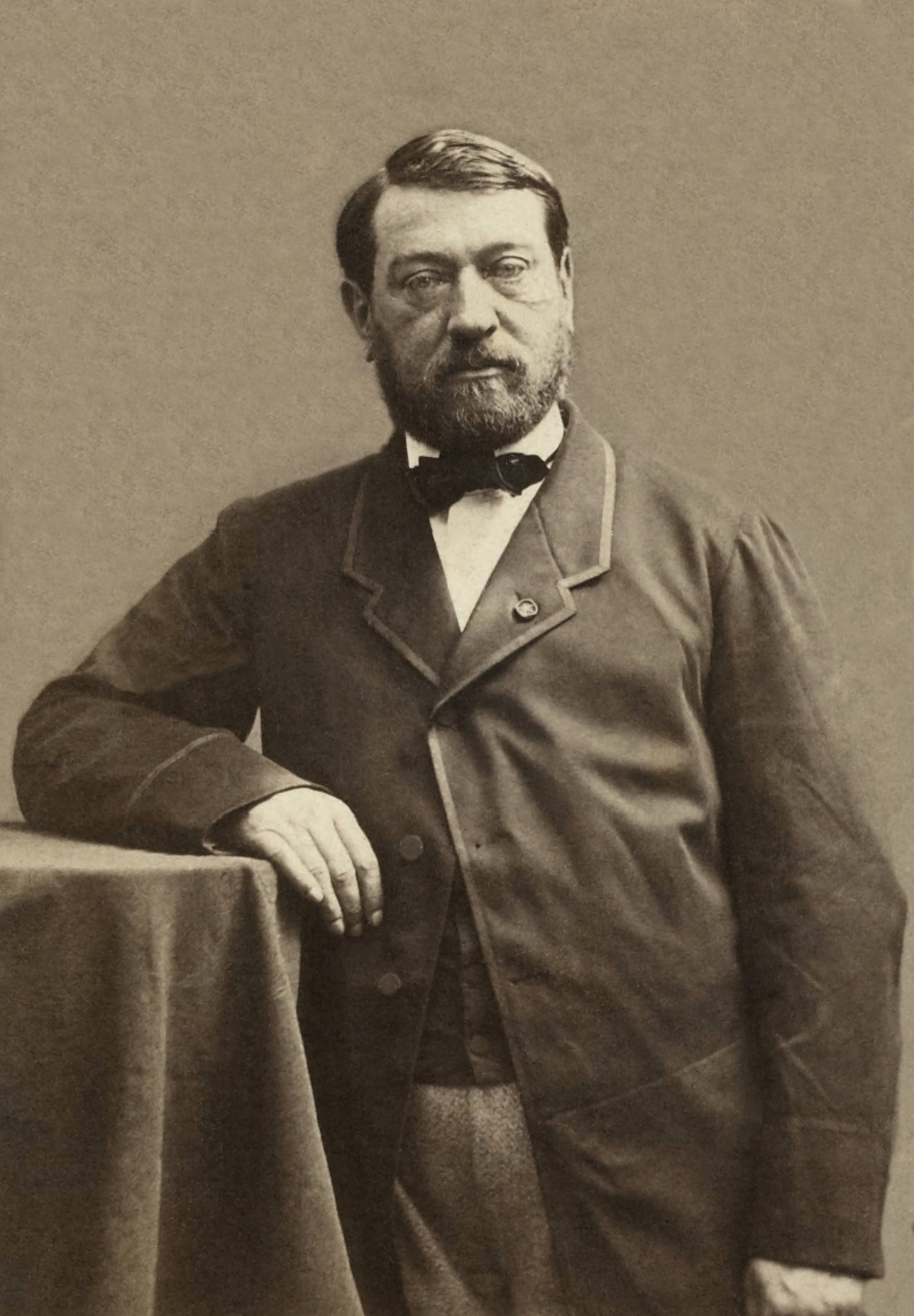
- Auguste Mariette. Photo by Nadar, c. 1861
- Born: François Auguste Ferdinand Mariette; 11 February 1821; Boulogne-sur-Mer, France
- Died: 18 January 1881 (aged 59); Cairo, Egypt
- Occupation: Egyptologist

François Auguste Ferdinand Mariette (French pronunciation: [ɔɡyst(ə) maʁjɛt]; 11 February 1821 – 18 January 1881) was a French scholar, archaeologist and Egyptologist, and the founder of the Egyptian Department of Antiquities, the forerunner of the Supreme Council of Antiquities.

== Early career ==
Auguste Mariette was born in Boulogne-sur-Mer, where his father was town clerk. Educated at the Boulogne municipal college, where he distinguished himself and showed much artistic talent, he went to England in 1839 when he was eighteen as professor of French and drawing at a boys' school at Stratford-upon-Avon. In 1840 he became pattern-designer to a ribbon manufacturer in Coventry, but he returned the same year to Boulogne, and in 1841 took a degree at the University of Douai. Mariette proved to be a talented draftsman and designer, and he supplemented his salary as a teacher at Douai by giving private lessons and writing on historical and archaeological subjects for local periodicals.

Meanwhile, his cousin Nestor L'Hôte, the friend and fellow-traveller of Champollion, died, and the task of sorting his papers filled Mariette with a passion for Egyptology. Largely self-taught, he devoted himself to the study of hieroglyphs and Coptic. His 1847 analytic catalogue of the Egyptian Gallery of the Boulogne Museum got him a minor appointment at the Louvre Museum in 1849.

He was elected as a member of the American Philosophical Society in 1869.

== First trip to Egypt ==
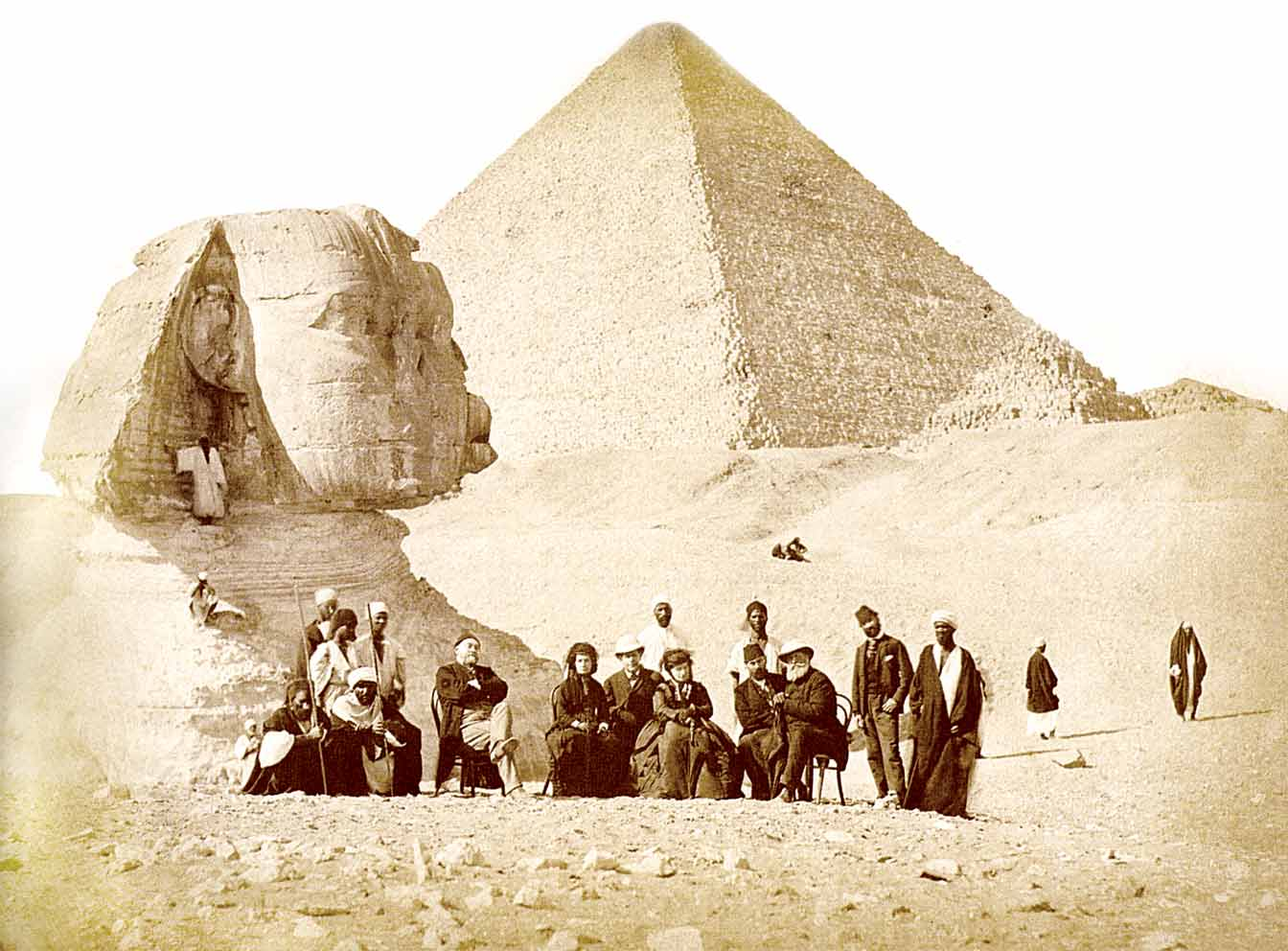
Auguste Mariette (seated, far left) and Emperor Pedro II of Brazil (seated, far right) with others during the monarch's visit to the Giza Necropolis at the end of 1871.

Mariette first went to Egypt in 1850. He was entrusted with a government mission for the purpose of seeking and purchasing high-quality Coptic, Syriac, Arabic and Ethiopic manuscripts for the Louvre collection so that it retained its then-supremacy over other national collections.

After little success in acquiring manuscripts due to inexperience, and to avoid returning empty-handed to France and wasting what might be his only trip to Egypt, he visited temples and befriended a Bedouin tribe, who led him to Saqqara. The site initially looked "a spectacle of desolation...[and] mounds of sand", but on noticing one sphinx from the reputed avenue of sphinxes that led to the ruins of the Serapeum of Saqqara near the step-pyramid, he gathered 30 workmen. In 1851, he made a discovery of this avenue and the subterranean tomb-temple complex of catacombs which contained sarcophagi of the Apis bulls. On November 12, he found thousands of statues, bronze tablets and other treasures, but only one intact sarcophagus within the complex. He also found the virtually intact tomb of Prince Khaemweset, Ramesses II's son.

Accused of theft and destruction by rival diggers and by the Egyptian authorities, Mariette began to rebury his finds in the desert to keep them from these competitors. Instead of manuscripts, official French funds were now advanced for the prosecution of his researches. He remained in Egypt for four years, excavating, discovering, and dispatching archaeological treasures to the Louvre. However, the French government and the Louvre set up an arrangement to divide the finds equally with Egypt. Due to this, upon his return to Paris 230 crates went to the Louvre, and an equal amount remained in Egypt.

== Director of Antiquities ==
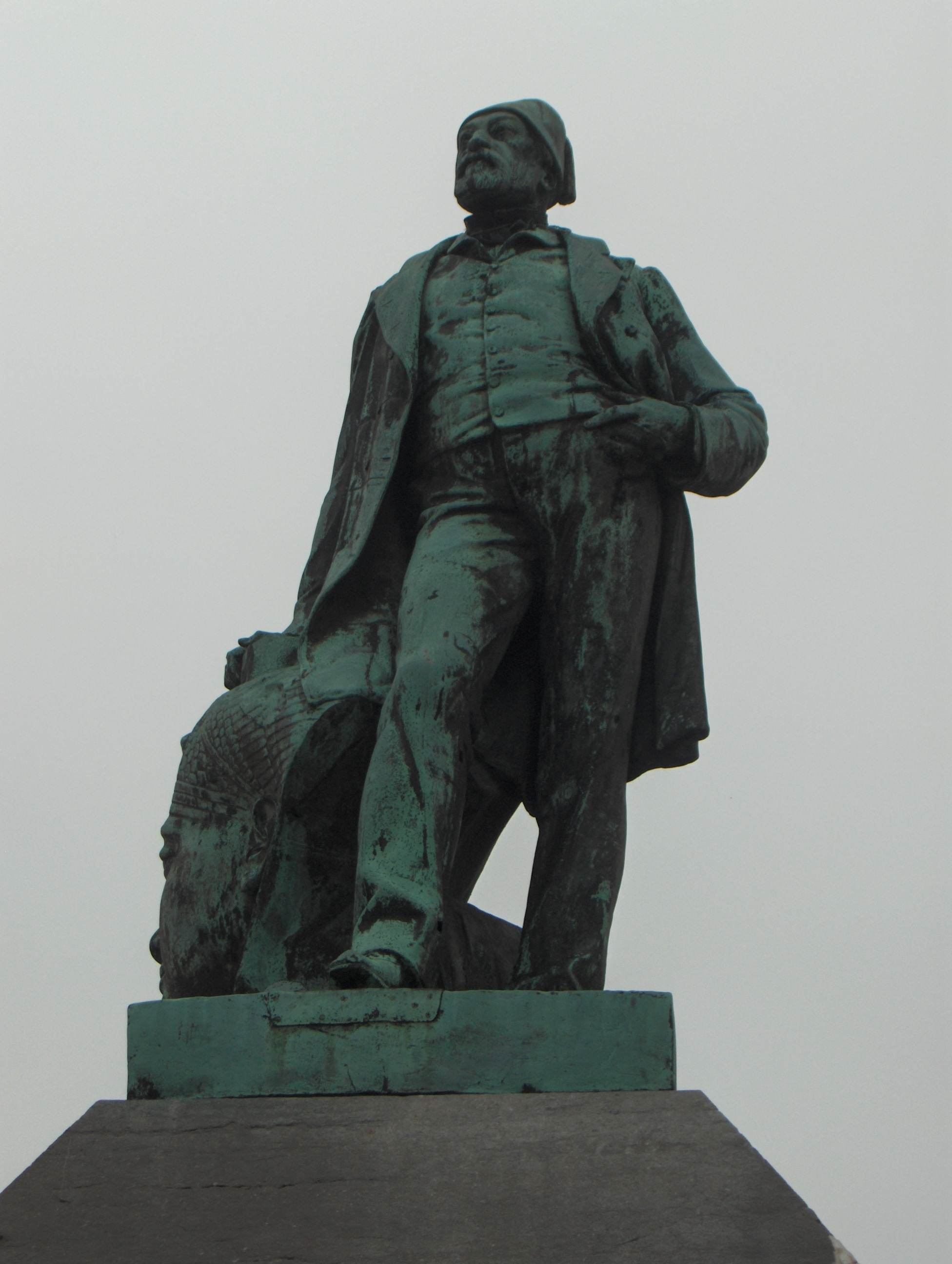
A statue of Auguste Mariette in his home city of Boulogne-sur-Mer.

After his discoveries at Saqqara, Mariette was not interested in a purely academic role, saying "I knew I would die or go mad if I did not return to Egypt immediately". After less than a year, he returned to Egypt at the insistence of the Egyptian government under Sa'id of Egypt, who created the position of Conservator of Egyptian monuments for him in 1858.

The following are Mariette's most notable explorations and discoveries after he moved his family to Cairo:

- Gaining government funds open the museum in Cairo at Bulaq in 1863 in order to take the pressure off the sites and stop the trade in illicit antiquities.
- The pyramid-fields of Memphis and (exploiting his previous success to find a cache of ca. 2000BC painted wooden statues such as the Seated Scribe) the tombs of Saqqara.
- The necropolis of Meidum, and those of Abydos and Thebes.
- Disinterred the great temples of Dendera and Edfu.
- The first full Egyptian use of the stratigraphic methods first developed by Karl Richard Lepsius and of the photographing of every object prior to its excavation carried out at the excavations of Karnak, Medinet Habu and Deir el-Bahri.
- Partially explored the archealogical site of Tanis (the Egyptian capital in the Late Period).
- Explored the Gebel Barkal in Sudan.
- He cleared the sands around the Sphinx down to the bare rock, and in the process discovered the famous granite and alabaster monument, the "Temple of the Sphinx".

In 1860 alone, Mariette set up 35 new dig sites, whilst attempting to conserve already-dug sites. His success was aided by the fact that no rivals were permitted to dig in Egypt, a fact that the British (who had previously had the majority of Egyptologists active in the country) and Germans (who were politically allied with the country's Ottoman rulers) protested it as a 'sweetheart deal' between Egypt and France. Mariette also had unstable relations with the Khedive. The Khedive assumed all discoveries ranked as treasure and that what went to the museum in Cairo went only at his pleasure. In February 1859, Mariette dashed to Thebes to confiscate a large number of antiquities from the nearby tomb of Queen Ahhotep I that were to have been sent to the Khedive.

In his position as Director of the Antiquities Service, Mariette made concerted efforts to stifle the careers of Egyptians such as Ahmad Kamal within the Service. Heinrich Brugsch, a German philologist documented how Mariette was suspicious of Egyptians and forbade Egyptians from copying hieroglyphs in the Cairo Museum. Mariette was concerned, Brugsch states, that Egyptians might be appointed into official positions within the Museum and was dedicated to stopping that from occurring.

In 1867, he returned to oversee the ancient Egyptian stand at the Exposition Universelle to a hero's welcome for keeping France preeminent in Egyptology. In 1869, at the request of the Khedive, he wrote a brief plot for an opera. The following year this concept, worked into a scenario by Camille du Locle, was proposed to Giuseppe Verdi, who accepted it as a subject for Aida. (Note: The Khedive had asked Verdi to compose an ode in honour of the opening of the Suez Canal and the new Royal Opera House in Cairo in November 1869, but the composer declined. The Opera House opened with a performance of Rigoletto.) For Aida, Mariette and Du Locle oversaw the scenery and costumes, which were inspired by the art of Ancient Egypt. The premiere of Aida was originally scheduled for February 1871, but was delayed until 24 December 1871, due to the siege of Paris at the height of the Franco-Prussian War (which trapped Mariette with the costumes and scenery in Paris). The opera met with great acclaim.

Mariette was raised successively to the rank of bey and pasha, and European honors and orders were bestowed on him.

In 1878, his museum was ravaged by floods, which destroyed most of his notes and drawings. By the spring of 1881, prematurely aged and nearly blind, Mariette arranged for the appointment of the Frenchman Gaston Maspero (a linguist rather than an archaeologist, who he had met at the Exposition in 1867), to ensure that France retained its supremacy in Egyptology in Egypt.

== Death ==
He died in Cairo and was interred in a sarcophagus which is on display in the Garden of the Egyptian Museum, Cairo.

The bust of other famous Egyptologists, including Charles Wycliffe Goodwin, have been placed on a semi-circular memorial around the sarcophagus.

== List of selected publications ==
Publications

- Mariette, Auguste. 1857. (Le) Sérapéum de Memphis. Paris: Gide.
- Mariette, Auguste. 1875. Karnak: étude topographique et archéologique avec un appendice comprenant les principaux textes hiéroglyphiques découverts ou recueillis pendant les fouilles exécutées à Karnak. Leipzig: J.C. Hinrichs.
- Mariette-Bey, Auguste (1877). Deir-el-Bahari. Documents topographiques, historiques et ethnographiques recueillis dans ce temple (in French). Leipzig: J C Hinrichs.
- Mariette, Auguste. 1880. Catalogue général des monuments d'Abydos découverts pendant les fouilles de cette ville. Paris: L'imprimerie nationale.
- Mariette, Auguste. [1888] 1976. Les mastabas de l'ancien empire: Fragment du dernier ouvrage de Auguste Édouard Mariette. G. Olms. ISBN 3487059878
- Mariette, Auguste. 1890. The monuments of Upper Egypt. Boston: H. Mansfield & J.W. Dearborn.
- Mariette, Auguste. 1892. Outlines of Ancient Egyptian History. New York: C. Scribner's Sons.
- Mariette, Auguste. 1981. Monuments divers recueillis en Egypte et en Nubie. LTR-Verlag. ISBN 3887060636
- Mariette, Auguste. 1999. Voyage dans la Haute-Egypte: Compris entre Le Caire et la première cataracte. Errance. ISBN 2877721779

== See also ==
- Suez Canal Company
