= Pierre Montet =

French Egyptologist (1885–1966)

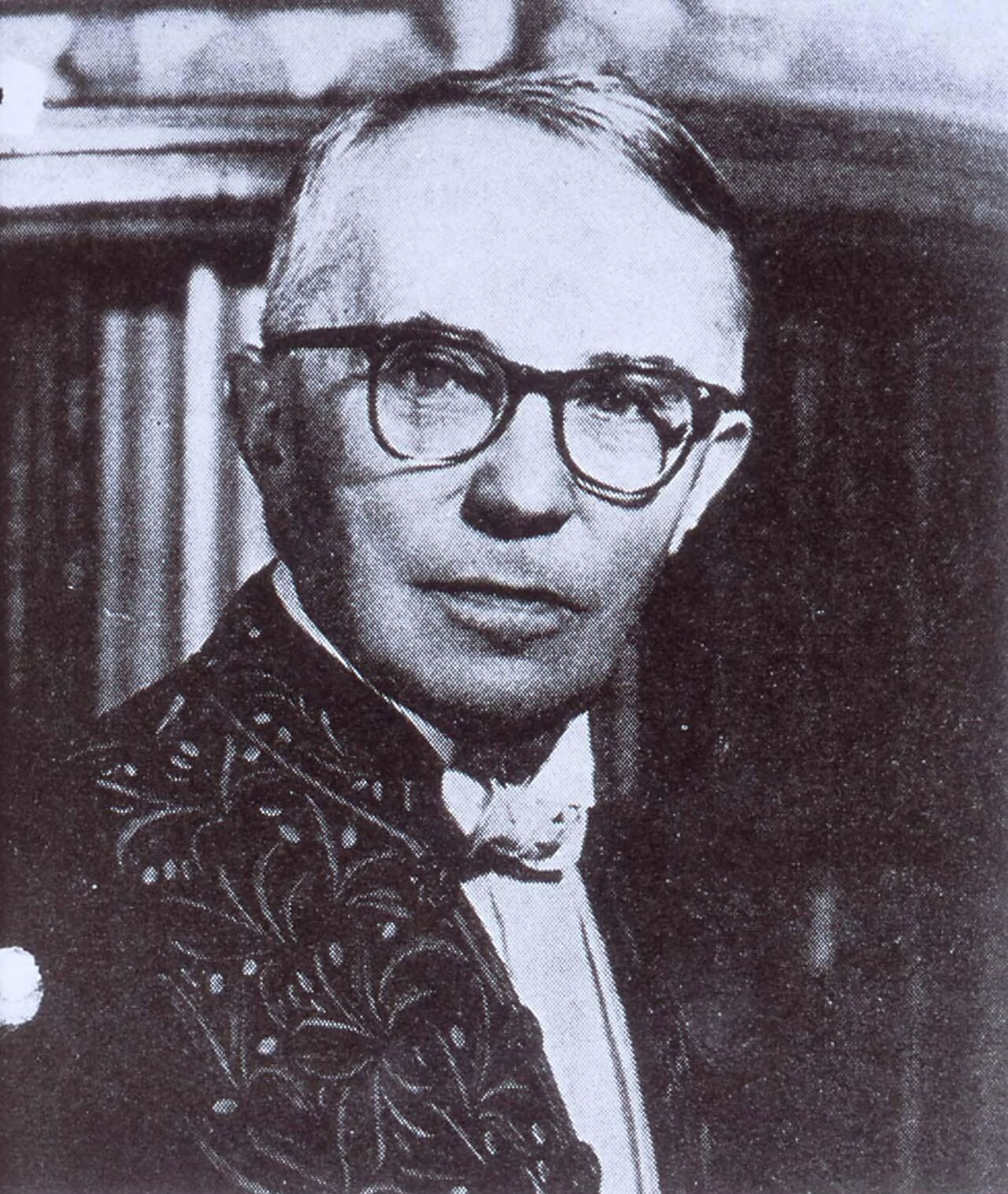
Pierre Montet

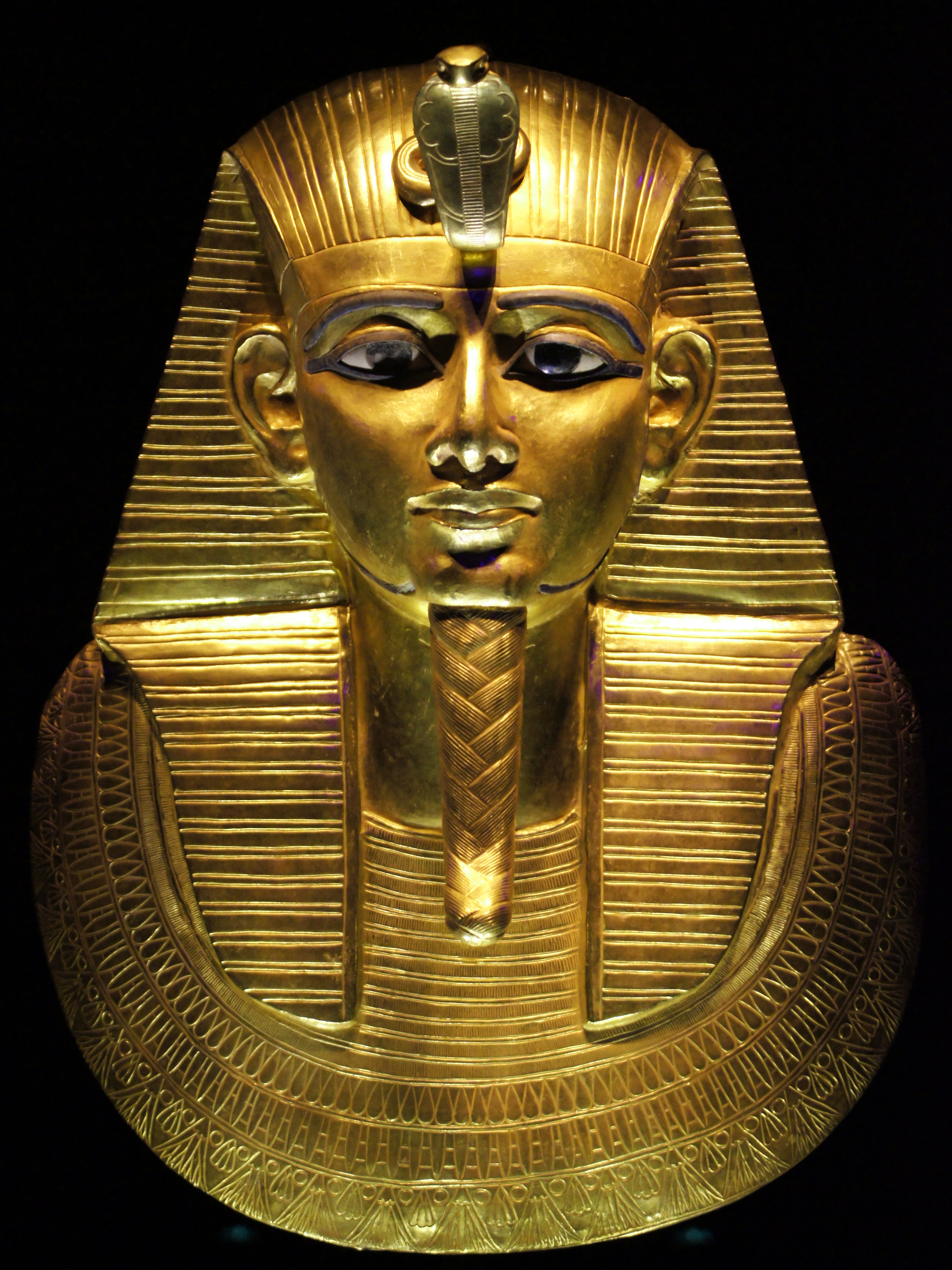
Psusennes I's mask: discovered at Tanis by Montet in 1940

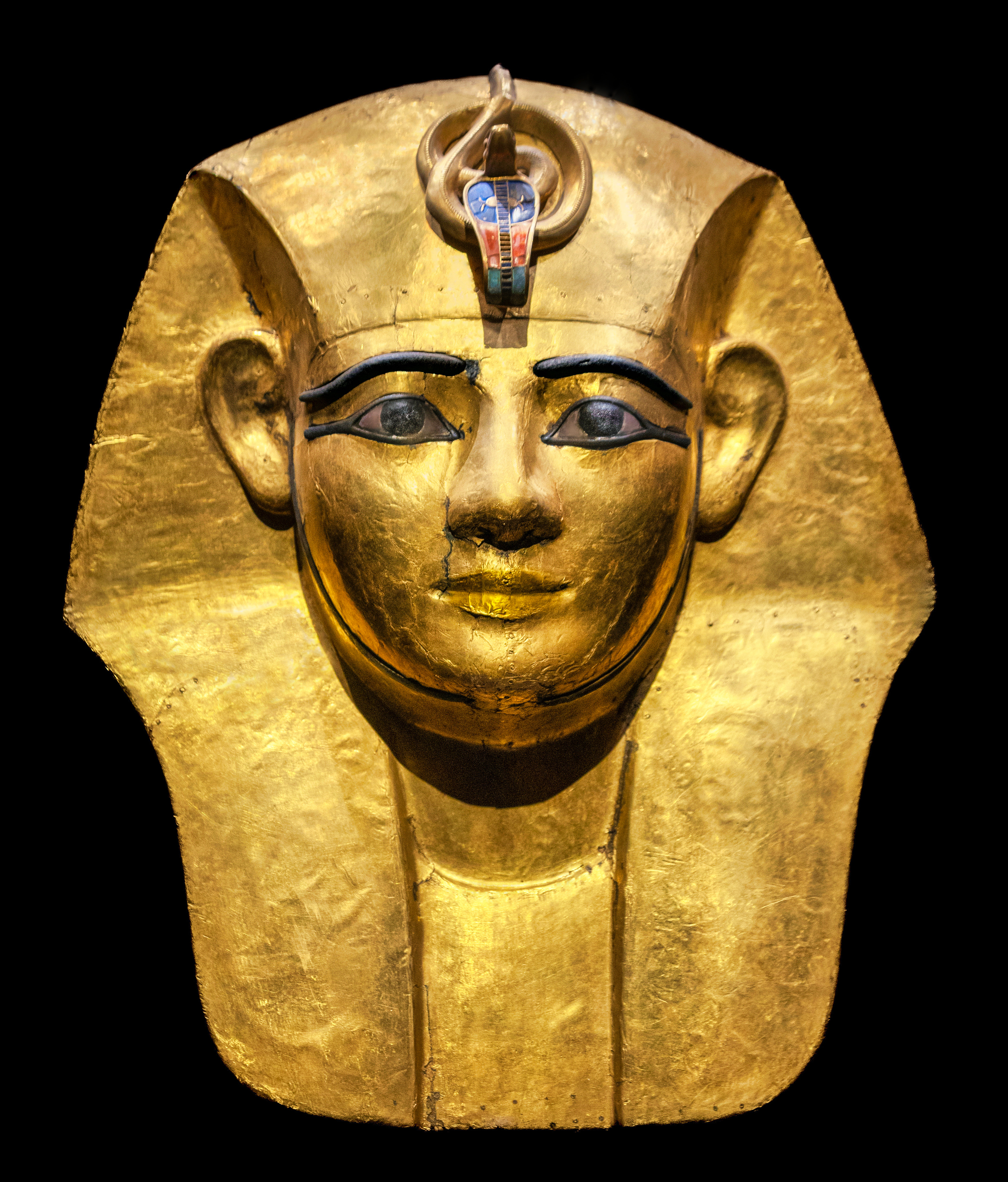
Amenemope's mask discovered at Tanis by Montet in 1940.

Jean Pierre Marie Montet (27 June 1885 – 19 June 1966) was a French Egyptologist.

== Biography ==
Montet was born in Villefranche-sur-Saône, Rhône, and began his studies under Victor Loret at the University of Lyon.

He and Jules Barthoux worked in Cairo together in 1911.

He was awarded the Commander of the Legion of Honor and Croix de Guerre for his work during WWI.

He excavated at Byblos in Lebanon between 1920 and 1924. During his time there, he excavated tombs of rulers from Middle Kingdom times. Between 1929 and 1939, he excavated at Tanis, Egypt, finding the royal necropolis of the Twenty-first and Twenty-second Dynasties: those finds almost equalled that of Tutankhamun's tomb in the Valley of the Kings.

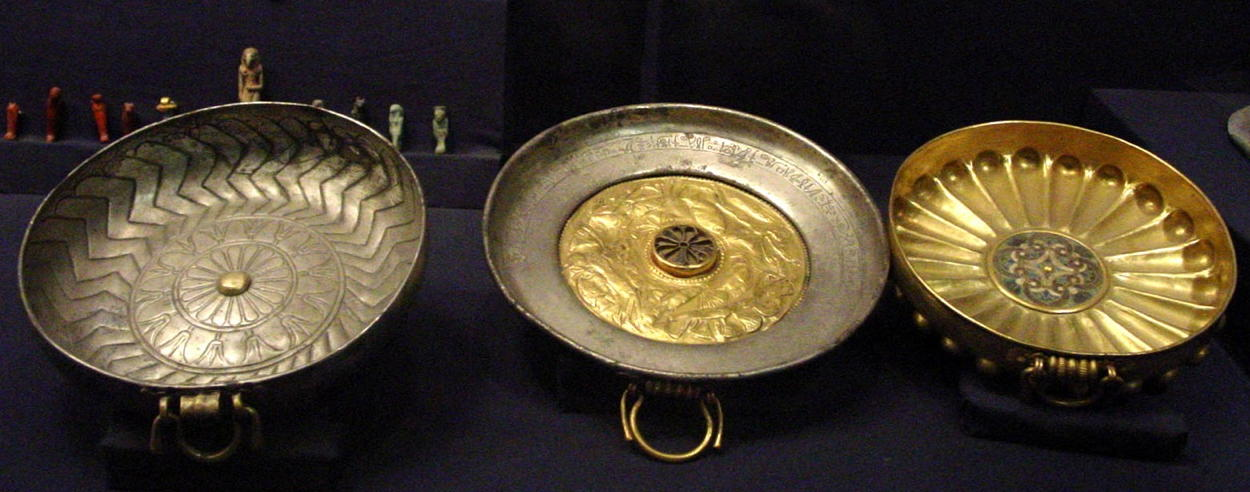
Wendebauendjed's unique cups from his intact Tanis tomb were discovered by Pierre Montet in 1946.

In the 1939–1940 Egypt excavation season, he discovered the completely-intact tombs of three Egyptian pharaohs at Tanis: Psusennes I, Amenemope, and Shoshenq II along with the partially plundered tomb of Takelot I. The latter tomb contained a gold bracelet of Osorkon I, Takelot's father, as well as a heart scarab. He also found the fully plundered tomb of Osorkon II as well as the partly plundered tomb of this king's son, Prince Hornakht. The start of World War II in Western Europe in May 1940 stopped all excavation work at Tanis. However, after the war, Montet resumed his activities at Tanis and proceeded to uncover the intact tomb of General Wendjebauendjed, (literally the Commander-in-Chief of the Army) who served under Psusennes I, in 1946. He also discovered two of the wells within the Amoun temple.

During his academic career, he served as Professor of Egyptology at the University of Strasbourg from 1919 to 1948 and then at the Collège de France, Paris, between 1948 and 1956. He died in Paris on 19 June 1966.

== Legacy ==
Montet believed that his excavations at Tanis had uncovered Pi-Ramesses. After his death, Austrian Egyptologist Manfred Bietak discovered that although Montet had discovered Pi-Ramesses stonework at Tanis, the true location of the ancient city lay some 30 km to the south. Montet can be credited, however, as the discoverer of the "transplanted" city of Pi-Ramesses.

== Works ==
- Les inscriptions hiéroglyphiques et hiératiques du Ouâdi Hammâmât (with Jules Couyat-Barthoux), 1912
- Byblos et l'Egypte, quatre campagnes de fouilles à Byblos, 1928
- La Necropole Royale de Tanis, 1958
- Everyday Life in the Days of Ramesses the Great, 1958
- Eternal Egypt, 1964
- Tanis, douze années de fouilles dans une capitale oubliée du delta Égyptien, Payot, Paris, 1942 ('Tanis, Twelve Years of Excavations in a Forgotten Capital of the Egyptian Delta')

== Gallery ==
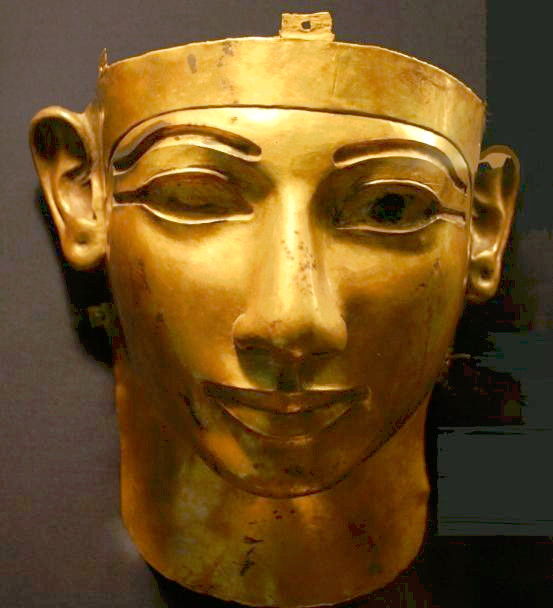
Mummy mask of Shoshenq II of the 22nd dynasty from Tanis

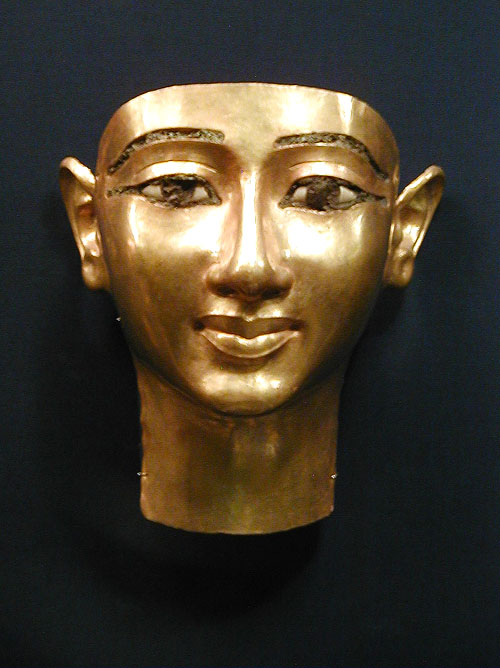
Mummy mask of Wendjebauendjed from Tanis

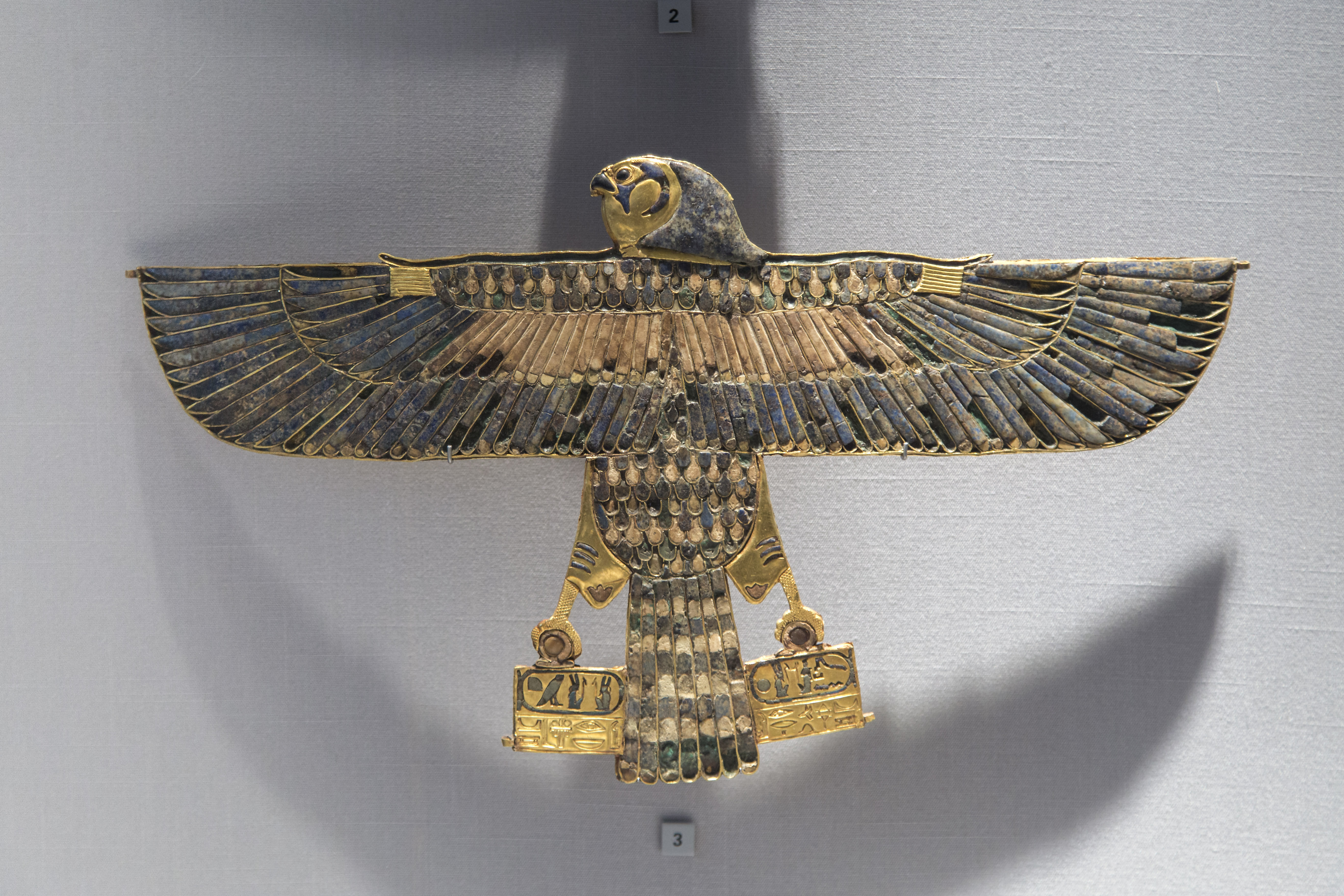
Flying Falcon Amulet of Amenemope

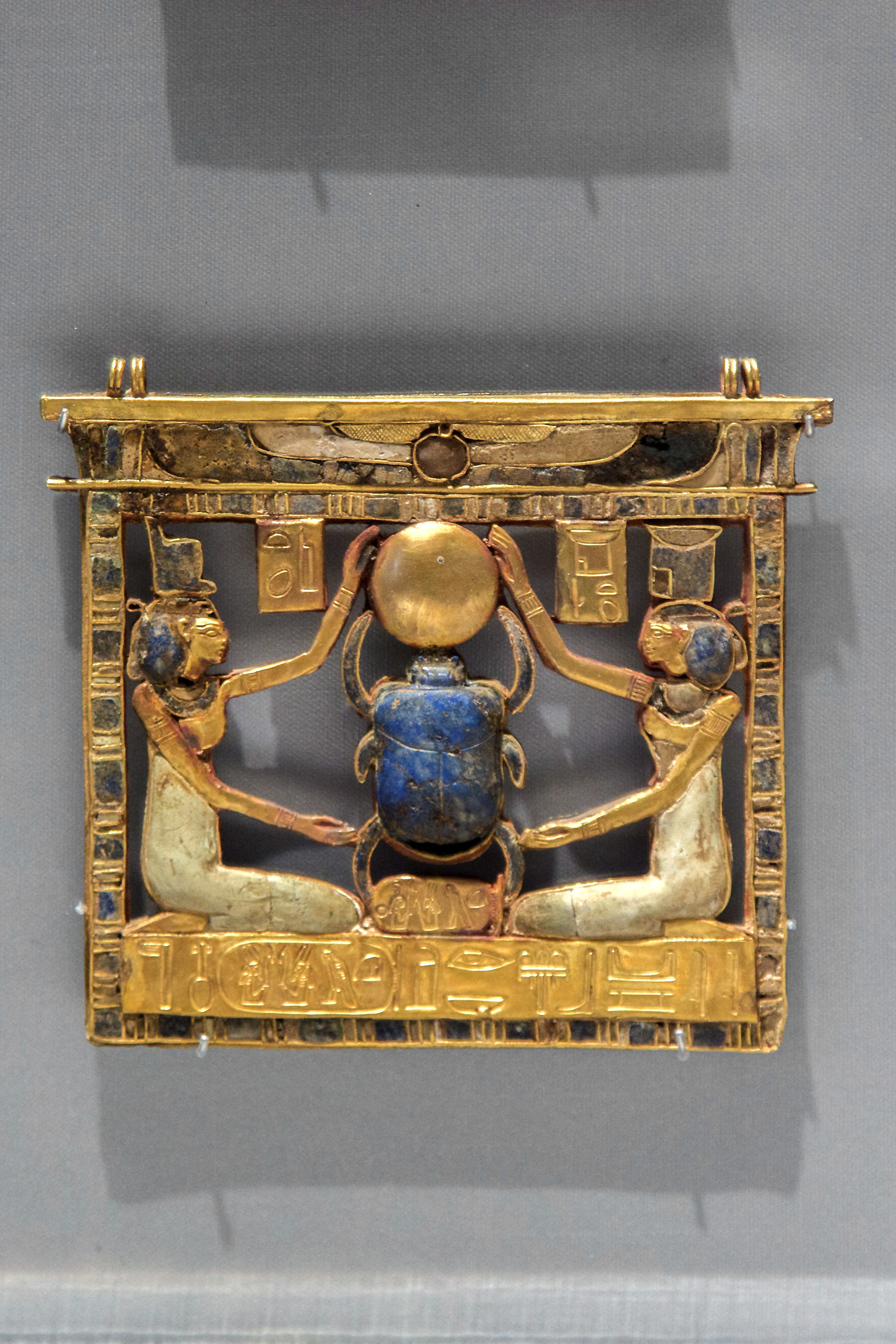
Amenemope's pectoral made from lapis lazuli and gold featuring Isis and Nephthys.

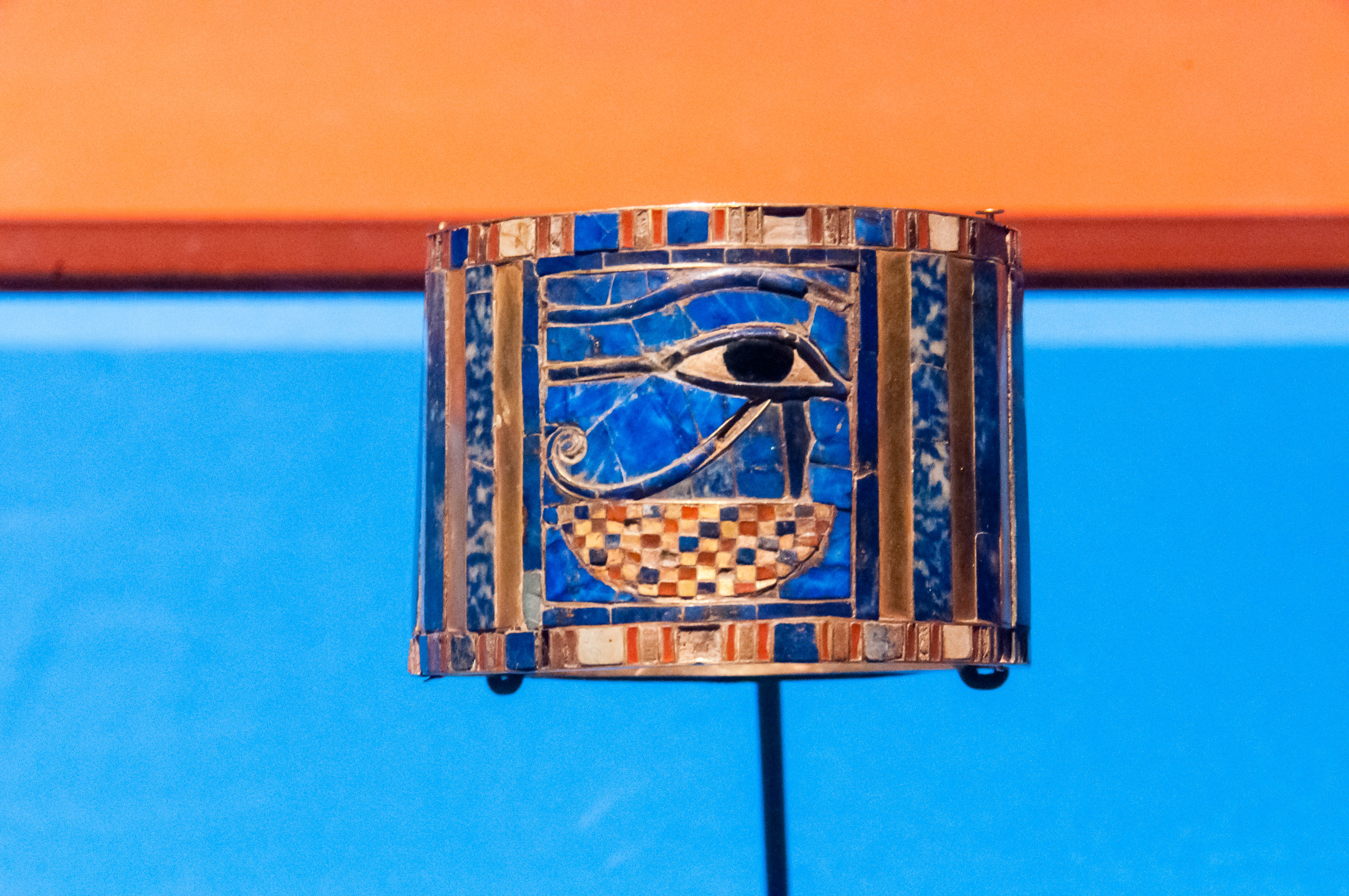
Bracelet of Hedjkheperre Shoshenq I featuring the Eye of Horus from tomb NRT III at Tanis

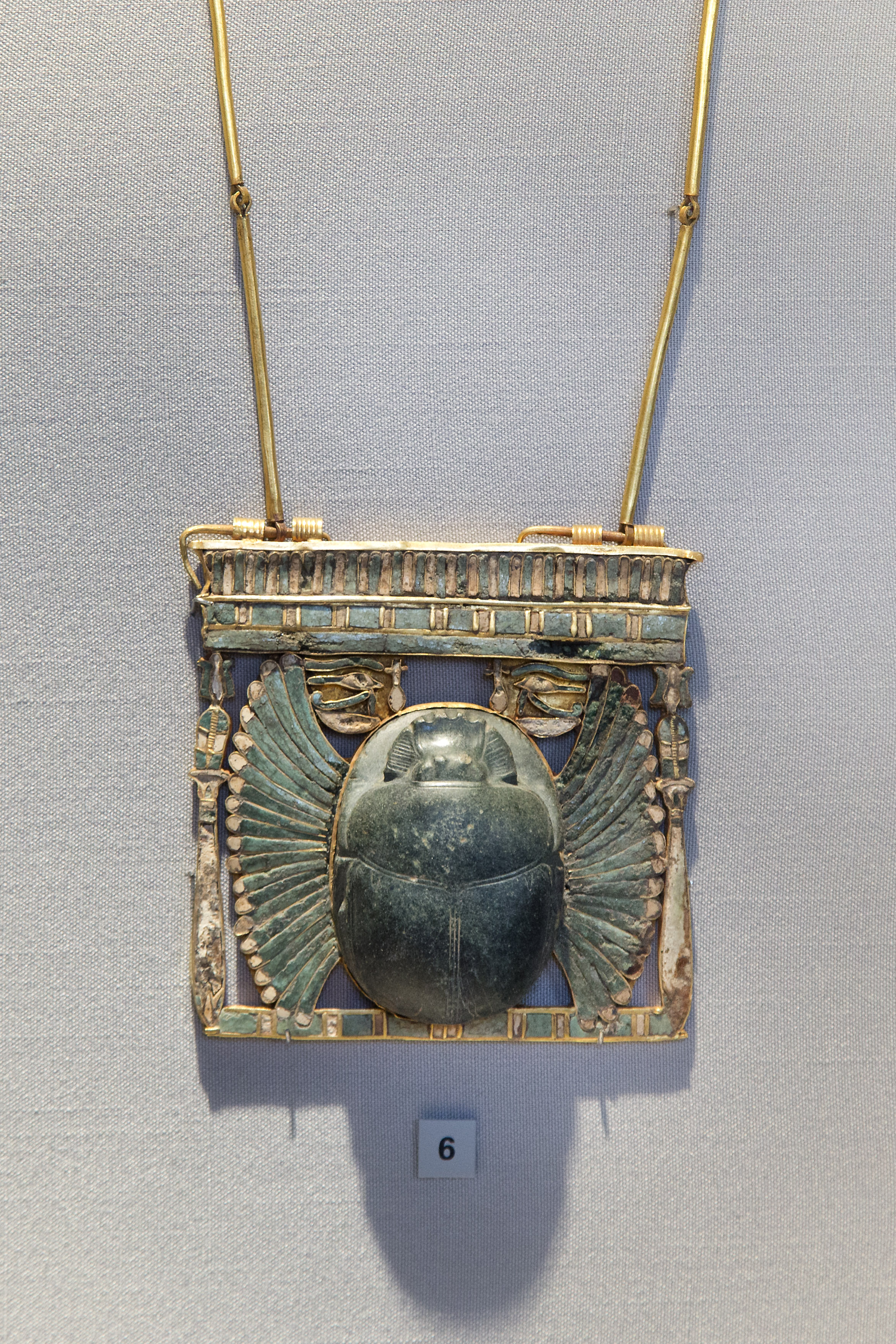
Wendjebauendjed's pectoral from his tomb at Tanis
