= Pami II =

Egyptian Pharaoh

Pharaoh
- Reign: c. 712 BC
- Predecessor: Osorkon IV
- Successor: Bakenranef or Shabataka
Royal titulary
Horus name
Netjerikha
nṯrj-ḫʿ
Divine of appearance
G5	R8 D21 N28
Prenomen
Neferkare
nfr-kꜣ-rˁ
The perfect one is the Ka or Ra

M23 X1 L2 X1	N5 nfr D28
Nomen
Pami
pꜣ-my
Pamy ("the Tomcat")

G39 N5	p W19 i i
- Children: Gemenefkhonsbak ?
- Father: Osorkon IV ?
- Dynasty: Tanite 23rd Dynasty

Neferkare Pami or Pami II (Egyptian nfr-kꜣ-rʿ p-my or pꜣ-my, variant writings of pꜣ-mjw) was an obscure pharaoh of the Tanite 23rd Dynasty, who was fully identified only in 2018. He reigned in the late 8th century BC.

== Evidence and interpretation ==
The existence of a Tanite king with the throne name Neferkare and a birth name beginning P[…] was first noted on the basis of blocs discovered during the exploration of the sacred lake of Amun at Tanis by Pierre Montet, who identified the king as the Horus "Neterti-Khâ, Neferkarê Pe[pi]." In one instance, the royal throne name seems to have been purposefully erased from within its cartouche. Montet also noted the archaizing quality of both the relief style and of the royal titulary, and that the throne name Neferkare was also borne by the roughly contemporary kings Neferkare Peftjauawybast of Herakleopolis and Shabaka of the Kushite 25th Dynasty. The blocs discovered by Montet constituted an upper portion of a scene that depicted the king followed by a representation of his Ka.

Kenneth Kitchen was uncertain whether this was an attestation of a king from the Third Intermediate Period or a reference to Neferkare Pepi II of the 6th Dynasty. He nevertheless tentatively associated this royal name with that of Neferkare, which appeared alternating with that of Wahibre in a cornice from Athribis, and proposed that Neferkare P[…] was a local king of Tanis who was a contemporary and ally of Wahibre Psamtik I of the 26th Dynasty. Based on this, he concluded that Psamtik, once he became pharaoh, could no longer tolerate the multitude of rulers with claims of kingship upon the Lower Egypt, and in a few years he managed to force them to become his vassals, depriving them of royal titles and ambitions. Neferkare of Tanis – who could have claimed a far more ancient royal line than that of Psamtik (since, technically, Neferkare was a distant successor of Shoshenq I of the 22nd Dynasty) – was likely the last of them, but like all others he was finally subdued around 657–656 BC.

Marie-Ange Bonhême duly recorded the fragmentary evidence uncovered by Montet among her coverage of other obscure or doubtful monarchs. Jürgen von Beckerath accepted the identification, but read the presumed beginning of the birth name as j instead of p. David Aston accepted King Neferkare P[…] as a member of the Tanite 23rd Dynasty and dated him to c. 664 BC as a contemporary of Psamtik I.

Further exploration of the remains of Tanis, more specifically the temple precinct and sacred lake of Mut, yielded additional decorated and inscribed stone blocs, which allowed the more complete identification of Neferkare P[…] as Neferkare Pami II by Raphaëlle Meffre and Frédéric Payraudeau. The blocs depicted the king engaged in the pious act of offering to various gods and goddesses and made reference to the construction or extension of temples. In two instances, the royal name was found erased. Some blocs that Montet had attributed to the only King Pami known to him, Usermaatre Pami I-sibaste, are now reattributed to Pami II. Judging from the archaizing style of his monuments, Meffre and Payraudeau concluded that he was most probably contemporary with or close in date to the 25th Dynasty and should be dated to the end of the 8th century BC. They also dissociated the newly identified king Neferkare Pami II from the royal name Neferkare alternating with Wahibre on the cornice from Athribis, indicating that the latter instance belonged to a hitherto unrecognized King Neferkare Wahibre who reigned at a much later date.

Both the Horus name (Netjerikha) and throne name (Neferkare) of Pami II appear to reference the titulary of the long-lived Pepi II in the 6th Dynasty (who was the Horus Netjerikhau and had the throne name Neferkare). Although the choice and simplicity of the names is consistent with the archaism of the period, at least two attestations of the throne name seem to have included an epithet, probably Meryamun (mrj-jmn, "Beloved of Amun"). The king's birth name Pami ("the Tomcat"), found in two variant spellings (p-my and pꜣ-my), neither including the actual hieroglyphic sign for a cat (Gardiner E13), was nevertheless shared with King Usermaatre Pami I-sibaste and with the Chief of Ma Pami, a son of King Akheperre Shoshenq V.

On the basis of the advanced archaizing style of his monuments, Meffre and Payraudeau placed King Pami II generally between Usermaatre Osorkon IV and the King Pedubast of Tanis mentioned by the Assyrians in c. 670 BC. Since Tanis appears to have been seized by King Bakenranef of the Saite 24th Dynasty sometime before his own fall to the Kushites in 712 BC, and since neither of the Kushite kings Shabataka and Shabaka is attested at Tanis, the authors tentatively placed Pami II between 712 and c. 670 BC, preferring an earlier date, given the stylistic similarity to the works of Osorkon IV and the parallel instances of the erasure of a local king's name by the Kushites. The authors also noted the possibility that Pami II would correspond to King Psammous, recorded as the successor of Osorkhō in the 23rd Dynasty by the epitomes of Manetho, suggesting that the name Psammous was a distortion of an original Pamous or Pemous, attested Greek renditions of Egyptian pꜣ-mjw. If Manetho could be trusted, this might give Pami II a reign of 10 years and make him the heir of Osorkon IV.

The precise dating of Pami II remains a little uncertain, as is his connection to his predecessor Osorkon IV and to his eventual successors at Tanis, Shepseskare Gemenefkhonsbak and Sekhemkare and (=?) Pedubast III.

== Bibliography ==
- Aston, David 2009a, "Takeloth II, A King of the Herakleopolitan/Theban Twenty-Third Dynasty Revisited," in: G. P. F. Broekman, R. J. Demarée and O. E. Kaper (eds.), The Libyan Period in Egypt: Historical and Cultural Studies into the 21st–24th Dynasties, Leiden: 1-28. online
- Aston, David A. 2009b, Burial Assemblages of Dynasty 21-25: Chronology—Typology—Developments, Vienna: Österreichische Akademie der Wissenchaften.
- Beckerath, Jürgen von 1999, Handbuch der ägyptischen Königsnamen, Mainz am Rhein: Philipp von Zabern.
- Bonhême, Marie-Ange 1987, Les noms royaux dans l’Égypte de la troisième période intermédiaire, Cairo.
- Kitchen, Kenneth A. 1995, The Third Intermediate Period in Egypt (1100–650 BC), 3rd ed., Warminster: Aris & Phillips.
- Leprohon, Ronald J. 2013, The Great Name: Ancient Egyptian Royal Titulary, Society of Biblical Literature: Atlanta.
- Meffre, Raphaëlle, and Frédéric Payraudeau 2018, "Enquête épigraphique, stylistique et historique sur les blocs du lac sacré de Mout à Tanis," Bulletin de la société française d'Égyptologie 199: 128-143.
- Meffre, Raphaëlle, and Frédéric Payraudeau 2019, "Un nouveau roi à la fin de l’époque libyenne: Pami II," Revue d'égyptologie 69: 147-158.
- Montet, Pierre 1966, Le lac sacré de Tanis, Paris.
- Payraudeau, Frédéric 2015, "La situation politique de Tanis sous la XXVeme Dynastie," in: P. Kousoulis, N. Lazaridis (eds.), Proceedings of the Tenth International Congress of Egyptologists, University of the Aegean, Rhodes, 22-29 May 2008, OLA 241, Louvain: 849-860.
- Payraudeau, Frédéric 2020, L'Égypte et la vallée du Nil Tome 3: Les époques tardives (1069–332 av. J.-C.), Paris: Presses universitaires de France.
- Waddell, W. G. (transl.) 1940, Manetho, Cambridge, MA: Loeb Classical Library.
