= Osorkon =

V4 Aa18 M17 D21 V31 N35
Osorkon
Wsrkn
in hieroglyphs
Era: 3rd Intermediate Period
(1069–664 BC)

Osorkon (also Userken in older literature) was the name of many ancient Egyptians with Libyan ancestry. It could refers to:

- Osorkon the Elder: a pharaoh of the 21st Dynasty
- Osorkon I: a pharaoh of the 22nd Dynasty
- Osorkon II: a pharaoh of the 22nd Dynasty
- Osorkon III: a pharaoh of the 23rd Dynasty in Upper Egypt
- Osorkon IV: a pharaoh of the 22nd or 23rd Dynasty in Lower Egypt
- Osorkon A: a High Priest of Ptah in Memphis during the 22nd Dynasty
- Osorkon B: a Theban High Priest of Amun and prince, now believed to be Osorkon III (see above) in his early career
- Osorkon C: a Great Chief of the Ma, predecessor of Tefnakht
