= Osorkon IV =

Egyptian pharaoh

- Shilkanni, So
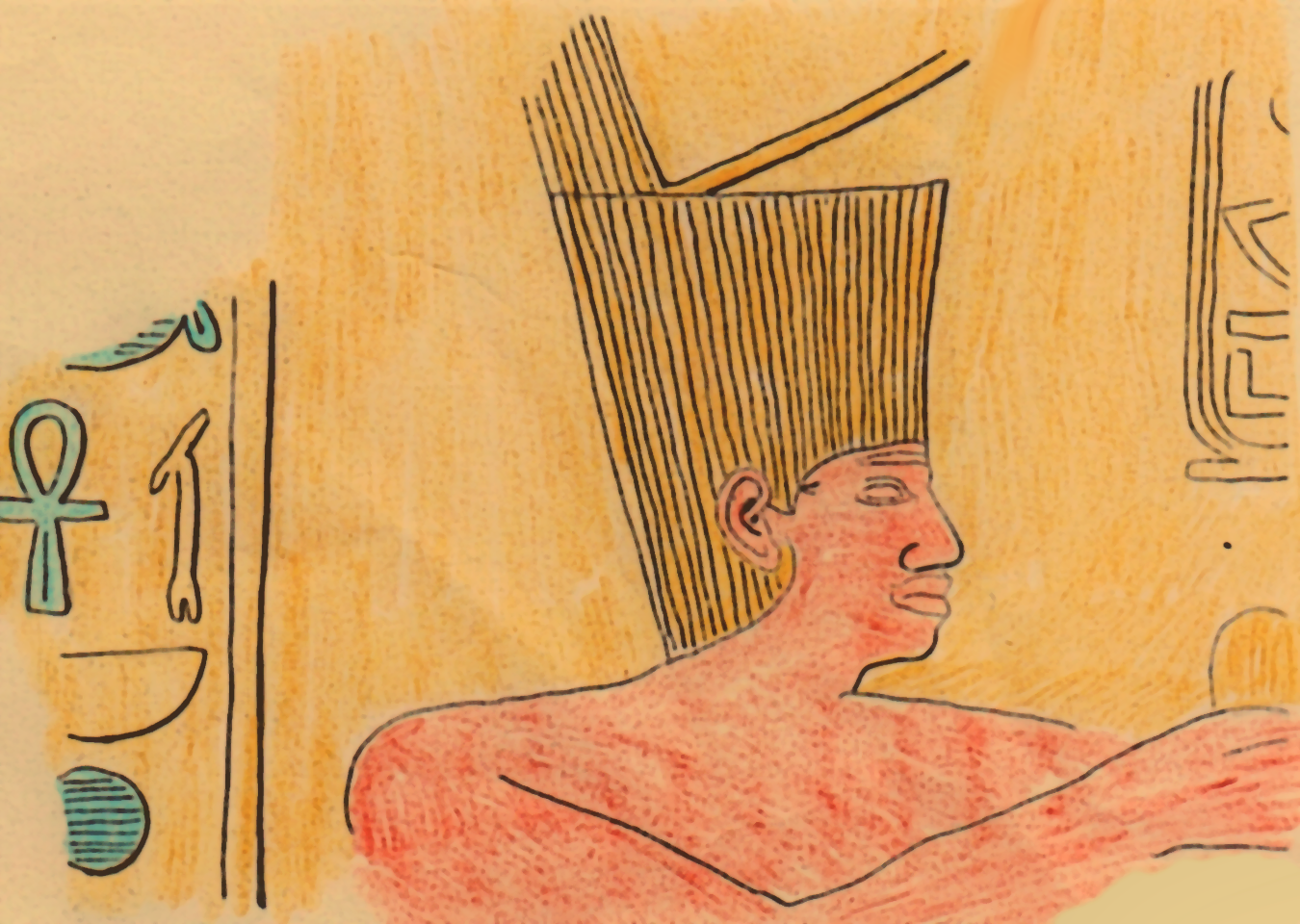
- Relief thought to depict Osorkon IV, from Tanis

Pharaoh
- Reign: 730–716 BC
- Predecessor: Shoshenq V or Pedubast II
- Successor: Pami II
Royal titulary
Prenomen
Usermaa(t)re
Wsr-mȝˁ(t)-Rˁ
Powerful is the maat of Ra

M23 X1 L2 X1	N5 U1 F12 Aa11 D36
Nomen
Osorkonu
Wsrknw
Osorkon(u)

G39 N5	V4 Aa18 D21 V31 W24
- Children: Pami II ?
- Father: Pedubast II ?
- Mother: Tadibast III
- Dynasty: 22nd Dynasty or 23rd Dynasty

Usermaatre Osorkon, designated Osorkon IV, was an ancient Egyptian pharaoh during the late Third Intermediate Period. Long considered the last king of the 22nd Dynasty, he was de facto little more than ruler in Tanis and Bubastis, in Lower Egypt and is now generally grouped in the Tanite 23rd Dynasty. He is generally – though not universally – identified with the King Shilkanni (Akkadian: 𒅆𒅋𒃶𒉌) mentioned by Assyrian sources, and with the biblical So, King of Egypt (Hebrew: סוֹא Sōʾ) mentioned in the second Books of Kings (17:4).

Osorkon ruled during one of the most chaotic and politically fragmented periods of ancient Egypt, in which the Nile Delta was dotted with small Libyan kingdoms and principalities and Meshwesh dominions; as the last heir of the Tanite rulers, he inherited the easternmost parts of these kingdoms, the most involved in all the political and military upheavals that soon would afflict the Near East. During his reign, he had to face the power of, and ultimately submit himself to, the Kushite King Piye during Piye's conquest of Egypt. Osorkon IV also had to deal with the threatening Neo-Assyrian Empire outside his eastern borders.

== Reign ==
=== Early years ===
According to the reconstruction of events by Kenneth Kitchen, Osorkon IV ascended to the throne of Tanis in c. 730 BC, after the long reign of Shoshenq V of the 22nd Dynasty, who was possibly his father and predecessor. However, this view was first challenged in 1970 by Karl-Heinz Priese, who preferred to place Osorkon IV in a lower–Egyptian branch of the 23rd Dynasty, just after the reign of the shadowy pharaoh Pedubast II; this placement found support among certain scholars. Aidan Dodson omitted Pedubast II and had Shoshenq V followed immediately by Osorkon IV, but still placed the latter in the Tanite 23rd Dynasty. More recently, Frédéric Payraudeau placed Sehetepibre Pedubast II at the start of the Tanite 23rd Dynasty, and has him succeeded by Osorkon IV. Osorkon's mother or wife, named on an electrum aegis of Sekhmet now in the Louvre, was Tadibast III. Osorkon IV's realm was restricted only to the district of Tanis (Rˁ-nfr) and the territory of Bubastis, both in the eastern Nile Delta. His neighbors were Libyan princes and Meshwesh chiefs who ruled their small realms outside of his authority.

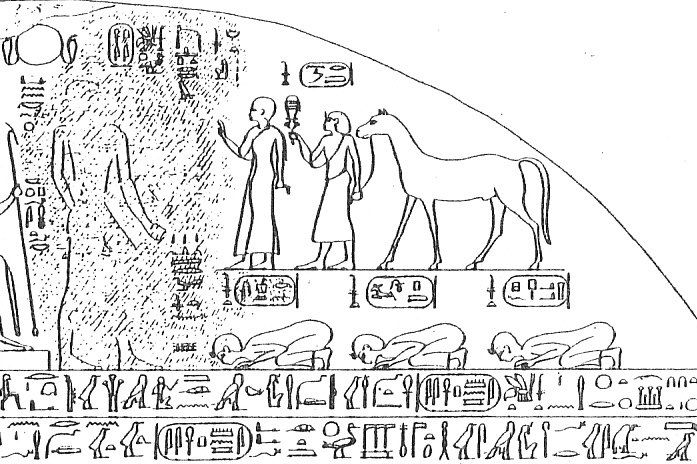
Closeup of the Victory Stela of Piye. Osorkon IV is the left one among the prostrating kings.

Around 729/28 BC, soon after his accession, Osorkon IV faced the invasion of the Kushite pharaoh Piye of the Nubian 25th Dynasty. Along with other rulers of Lower and Middle Egypt – mainly Nimlot of Hermopolis and Iuput II of Leontopolis – Osorkon IV joined the coalition led by the Chief of the West Tefnakht in order to oppose the Nubian. However, Piye's advance was unstoppable and the opposing rulers surrendered one after another: Osorkon IV found it wise to reach the Temple of Ra at Heliopolis and pay homage to his new overlord Piye personally— an action which was soon imitated by the other rulers. As reported on his Victory Stela, Piye accepted their submission, but Osorkon and most of the rulers were not allowed to enter the royal enclosure because they were not circumcised and had eaten fish, both abominations in the eyes of the Nubian. Nevertheless, Osorkon IV and the others were allowed to keep their former domains and authority.

=== The Assyrian threat ===
In 726/25 BC Hoshea, the last King of Israel, rebelled against the Assyrian King Shalmaneser V who demanded an annual tribute, and, according to the second Book of Kings, sought the support of So, King of Egypt (2 Kings 17:4) who, as already mentioned, was most likely Osorkon IV (see below). For reasons which remained unknown – possibly in order to remain neutral towards the powerful Neo-Assyrian Empire, or simply because he did not have enough power or resources – King So did not help Hoshea, who was subsequently defeated and deposed by Shalmaneser V. The Kingdom of Israel ceased to exist, many Israelites were brought to Assyria as exiles, and Assyrian and Babylonian settlers occupied Israel.

=== Battle of Raphia (720 BC) ===
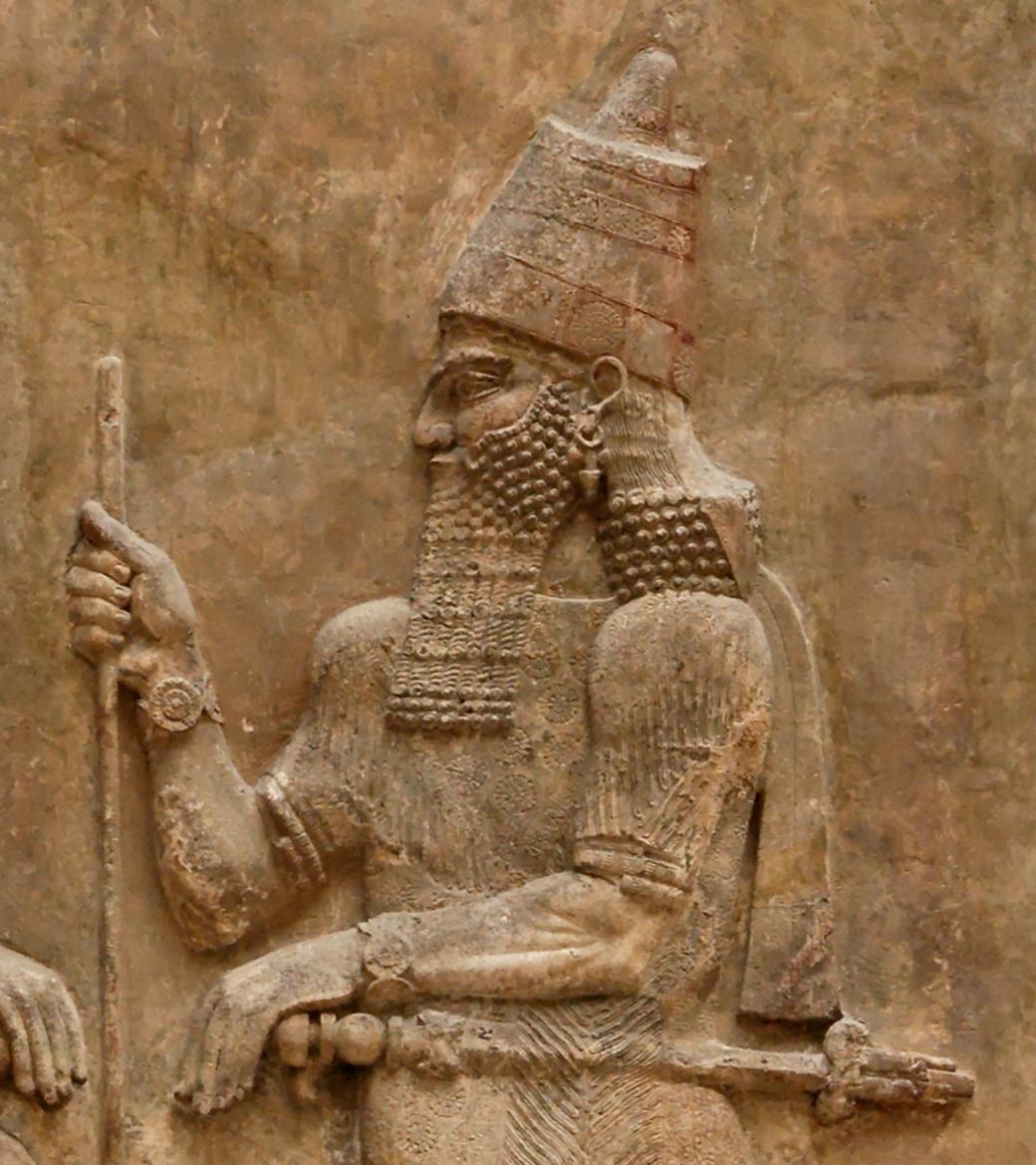
Sargon II, Osorkon's Assyrian opponent.

In 720 BC, a revolt occurred in Palestine against the new Assyrian King Sargon II, led by King Hanunu of Gaza who sought the help of "Pirʾu of Musri", a term most probably meaning "Pharaoh of Egypt" and referring to Osorkon IV. Assyrian sources claim that this time the Egyptian king did send a turtanu (an army–commander) called Reʾe or Reʾu (his Egyptian name was Raia, though in the past it was read Sibʾe) as well as troops in order to support his neighboring ally. However, the coalition was defeated in battle at Raphia. Reʾe fled back to Egypt, Raphia and Gaza were looted and Hanunu was burnt alive by the Assyrians.

In 716 BC, Sargon II almost reached Egypt's boundaries. Feeling directly threatened this time, Osorkon IV (here called Shilkanni by Assyrian sources, see below) was carefully diplomatic: he personally met the Assyrian king at the "Brook of Egypt" (most likely el-Arish) and tributed him with a present which Sargon personally described as "twelve large horses of Egypt without equals in Assyria". The Assyrian king appreciated his gifts and did not take action against Osorkon IV.

=== End ===
No mention of Osorkon IV is known after 716 BC. Some archaeological evidence suggest that shortly after this date, Bakenranef of the 24th Dynasty expanded his realm eastward, taking over Tanis. In 712 BC, Piye's successor Shebitku marched northward and defeated Bakenranef. When around the same year King Iamani of Ashdod sought refuge from Sargon II in Egypt, Shebitku was in fact the sole ruler of Egypt, and returned Iamani to the Assyrians in chains. In any case, Osorkon IV was seemingly dead before that year.

Whether it was Osorkon IV or a successor who was possibly supplanted by Bakenranef, Osorkon IV's line appears to have survived for decades. His immediate successor seems to have been the recently identified King Neferkare Pami II, who was eventually followed at Tanis by Shepseskare Gemenefkhonsbak, Sekhemkare, and Pedubast III.

== Identification with Shilkanni and So ==
It is believed that Shilkanni is a rendering of (U)shilkan, which in turn is derived from (O)sorkon – hence Osorkon IV – as first proposed by William F. Albright in 1956. This identification is accepted by several scholars while others remain uncertain or even skeptical. Shilkanni is reported by Assyrians as "King of Musri": this location, once believed to be a country in northern Arabia by the Orientalist Hans Alexander Winckler, is certainly to be identified with Egypt instead. In the same way, the "Pir'u of Musri" to whom Hanno of Gaza asked for help in 720 BC could only have been Osorkon IV. The identity of the biblical King So is somewhat less definite. Generally, an abbreviation of (O)so(rkon) is again considered the most likely by several scholars, but the concurrent hypothesis which equates So with the city of Sais, hence with King Tefnakht, is supported by a certain number of scholars.

== Attestations ==
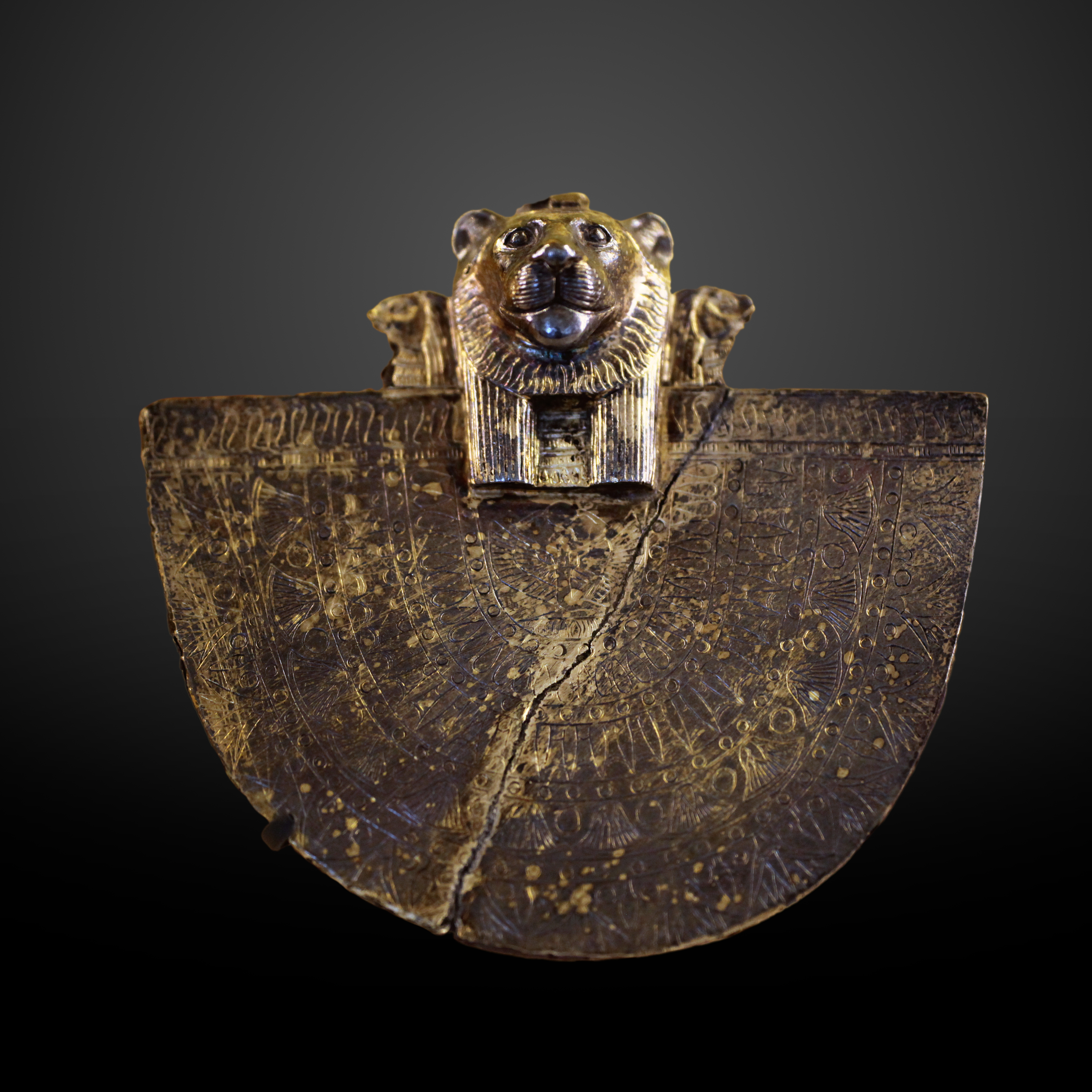
Small aegis of Sekhmet with the name of Osorkon and Tadibast, in the Louvre.

Osorkon IV is attested by Assyrian documents (as Shilkanni and other epithets) and probably also by the Books of Kings (as King So), while Manetho's epitomes list him as the second king of the 23rd Dynasty, Osorkhō, reigning for 8 years between Petoubatēs (Pedubast II) and Psammous (Pami II). He is undoubtedly attested on the well-known Victory Stela of Piye on which he is depicted while prostrating in front of the owner of the stela along with other submitted rulers. Another finding almost certainly referring to him is the aforementioned aegis of Sekhmet, found at Bubastis and mentioning a King Osorkon son of queen Tadibast who–as the name does not coincide with those of any of the other Osorkon kings' mothers–can only be Osorkon IV's mother.

=== About the throne name ===
Osorkon's throne name was thought to be Aakheperre Setepenamun from a few monuments naming a namesake pharaoh Osorkon, such as a faience seal and a relief–block, both in the Rijksmuseum van Oudheden in Leiden, but this attribution was questioned by Frederic Payraudeau in 2000. According to him, these findings could rather be assigned to an earlier Aakheperre Osorkon – i.e., the distant predecessor Osorkon the Elder of the 21st Dynasty – thus implying that Osorkon IV's real throne name was unknown. Furthermore, in 2010/11 a French expedition discovered in the Temple of Mut at Tanis two blocks bearing a relief of a King Usermaa(t)re Osorkonu, depicted in a quite archaizing style, which at first were attributed to Osorkon III. In 2014, on the basis of the style of both the relief and the royal name, Aidan Dodson rejected the identification of this king with both the already-known kings Usermaatre Osorkon (Osorkon II and III) and stated that he was rather Osorkon IV with his true throne name. A long-known, archaizing "glassy faience" statuette fragment from Memphis now exhibited at the Petrie Museum (UC13128) which is inscribed for one King Usermaatre, had been tentatively attributed to several pharaohs from Piye to Rudamun of the Theban 23rd Dynasty and even to Amyrtaios of the 28th Dynasty, but may in fact represent Osorkon IV.

== See also ==
- List of biblical figures identified in extra-biblical sources

== Bibliography ==
- Albright, William F. (1956). "Further Synchronisms between Egypt and Asia in the Period 935-685 BC". BASOR. 141: 23–27.
- von Beckerath, Jürgen (1994). "Osorkon IV = Herakles". Göttinger Miszellen. 139: 7–8.
- von Beckerath, Jürgen (1997). Chronologie des pharaonischen Ägyptens. Mainz am Rhein: Münchner Ägyptologische Studien 46.
- Berlandini, Jocelyne (1979). "Petits monuments royaux de la XXIe à la XXVe dynastie". Hommages à la mémoire de Serge Sauneron, vol. I, Egypte pharaonique. Cairo, Imprimerie de l'Institut d'Archeologie Orientale. pp. 89–114.
- Brandl, Helmut (2011). "Eine archaisierende Königsfigur der späten Libyerzeit (Osorkon IV ?)". In Bechtold, E.; Gulyás, A.; Hasznos, A. (eds.). From Illahun to Djeme. Papers Presented in Honour of Ulrich Luft. Archaeopress. pp. 11–23. ISBN 978-1-4073-0894-4.
- Clayton, Peter A. (2006). Chronicle of the Pharaohs: The Reign-by-Reign Record of the Rulers and Dynasties of Ancient Egypt. London: Thames & Hudson. ISBN 0-500-28628-0.
- Dodson, Aidan (2014). "The Coming of the Kushites and the Identity of Osorkon IV". In Pischikova, Elena (ed.). Thebes in the First Millennium BC PDF. Cambridge Scholars publishing. pp. 6–12. ISBN 978-1-4438-5404-7. Archived from the original on 2016-08-02.
- Dodson, Aidan; Hilton, Dyan (2004). The Complete Royal Families of Ancient Egypt. London: Thames & Hudson. ISBN 0-500-05128-3.
- Dodson, Aidan 2012, Afterglow of Empire: Egypt from the Fall of the New Kingdom to the Saite Renaissance, Cairo: American University in Cairo Press.
- Edwards, I.E.S. (1982). "Egypt: from the Twenty-second to the Twenty-fourth Dynasty". In Edwards, I.E.S. (ed.). The Cambridge Ancient History (2nd ed.), vol. III, part 1. Cambridge University Press. pp. 534–581. ISBN 0-521-22496-9.
- Goedicke, Hans (1963). "The end of "So, King of Egypt"". BASOR. 171: 64–66.
- Grimal, Nicolas (1992). A History of Ancient Egypt. Oxford: Blackwell Books. p. 512. ISBN 9780631174721.
- Jansen-Winkeln, Karl (2006). "Third Intermediate Period". In Hornung, Erik; Krauss, Rolf; Warburton, David A. (eds.). Ancient Egyptian Chronology. Brill, Leiden/Boston. pp. 234–264. ISBN 978-90-04-11385-5.
- Kahn, Dan'el (2001). "The Inscription of Sargon II at Tang-I Var and the Chronology of Dynasty 25". Orientalia. 70: 1–18.
- Kitchen, Kenneth A. (1995). The Third Intermediate Period in Egypt (1100–650 BC). Warminster: Aris & Phillips Limited. p. 608. ISBN 0-85668-298-5.
- Leahy, Anthony, ed. (1990). Libya and Egypt c. 1300–750 BC. University of London. Centre of Near and Middle Eastern Studies. p. 200. ISBN 0-521-22717-8.
- Mitchell, T. C. (1991). "Israel and Judah c. 750–700 B.C.". In Edwards, I.E.S. (ed.). The Cambridge Ancient History (2nd ed.), vol. III, part 2. Cambridge University Press. pp. 322–370. ISBN 0-521-22717-8.
- Patterson, Richard D. (2003). "The Divided Monarchy: Sources, Approaches, and Historicity". In Grisanti, Michel A.; Howard, David M. (eds.). Giving the sense: understanding and using Old Testament historical texts. Kregel. pp. 179–200. ISBN 978-0-8254-2892-0.
- Payraudeau, Frederic (2000). "Remarques sur l'identité du premier et du dernier Osorkon". Göttinger Miszellen. 178: 75–80.
- Payraudeau, Frédéric (2014). "Retour sur la succession Shabaqo-Shabataqo". NeHeT. 1: 115–127.
- Payraudeau, Frédéric 2020, L'Égypte et la vallée du Nil Tome 3: Les époques tardives (1069–332 av. J.-C.), Paris: Presses universitaires de France.
- Porter, Robert M. (2011). "Osorkon III of Tanis: the Contemporary of Piye?". Göttinger Miszellen. 230: 111–112.
- Priese, Karl-Heinz (1970). "Der Beginn der Kuschitischen Herrschaft in Ägypten". ZÄS. 98: 16–32.
- Redford, Donald B. (1985). "The Relations between Egypt and Israel from El-Amarna to the babylonian Conquest". Proceedings of the International Congress on Biblical Archaeology, Jerusalem, April 1984. Biblical Archaeology Today. pp. 192–203.
- Schneider, Hans D. (1985). "A royal epigone of the 22nd Dynasty. Two documents of Osorkon IV in Leiden". Mélanges Gamal Eddin Mokhtar, vol. II. Institut français d'archéologie orientale du Caire. pp. 261–267.
- Theis, Christoffer (2020). "Contributions to the Vocabulary of the Old Testament: The Connection of the Name סוֹא with Greek Σηγωρ in 2 Kings 17, 4". Biblica. 101: 107–13.
- Waddell, W. G. (transl.) 1940, Manetho, Cambridge, MA: Loeb Classical Library.
- Wilkinson, Toby (2011). The Rise and Fall of Ancient Egypt. New York: Random House. p. 560. ISBN 9780747599494.
- Yoyotte, Jean (1971). "Notes et documents pour servir à l'historie de Tanis". Kêmi. XXI: 36–45.
