= Pimay =

Ancient Egyptian prince, Libyan chief

Pami
- Chief of the Ma
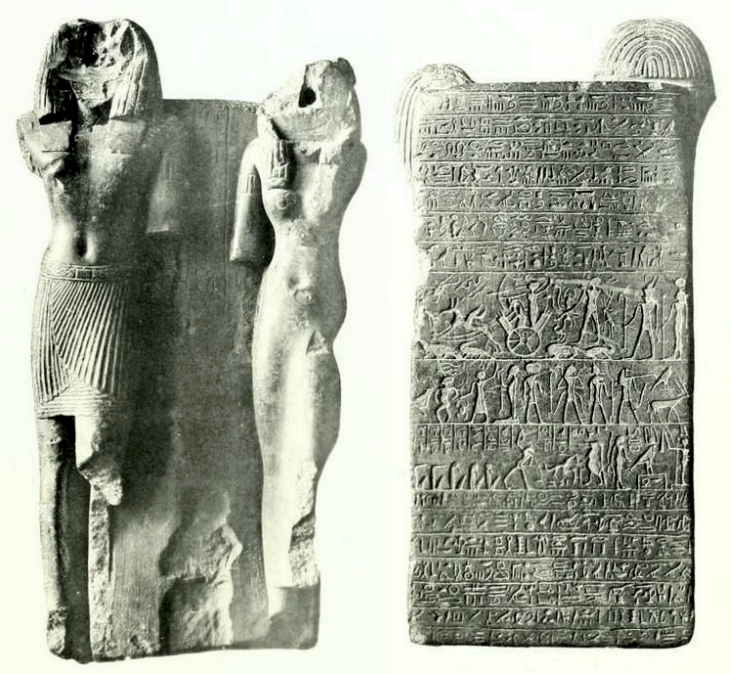
- The talisman of the Chief of Ma Pami.
- Successor: Peftjauawybaste?
- Dynasty: 22nd Dynasty
- Pharaoh: Shoshenq V?
- Father: Shoshenq V?

Pami or Pamiu (pȝ-mjw), wrongly read Pimay (pȝ-mȝj), was an ancient Egyptian prince, the son of a pharaoh named Shoshenq Meryamun, probably Shoshenq V. Pami was titled Chief of the Ma during his father's reign. He is known from a small inscribed talisman statue group in the Egyptian Museum at Cairo (CG 9430), depicting a god, probably Heryshaf, and a goddess, Ayt-Bastet. The last line of the text on the back of the piece reads "May his name endure before his father Heryshaf-King-of-the-Two-Lands, the Chief of Ma Pami, son of the Lord of the Two Lands Shoshenq Meryamun, living for eternity."

== Identity ==
In his influential work on the Third Intermediate Period, Kenneth A. Kitchen misread the name of the prince as Pimay and, despite his misgivings about a different orthography, suggested that he was a son of King Shoshenq III and that he was also identical with Shoshenq III's successor, King Pami I. Additionally, Kitchen suggested that the Chief of Ma's fief might have been Sais in the western Delta, the supposed place of origin of the statue group. It was later determined that Kitchen had misread the prince's name and that Shoshenq III was succeeded by another king named Shoshenq, designated Shoshenq IV. In more recent works, Aidan Dodson, while correcting Kitchen's reading of the name, suggested that the Chief of Ma Pami, still assumed to be a son of Shoshenq III, could be identical with King Pami I as the successor of Shoshenq IV.

More recently, Raphaëlle Meffre revised this interpretation. While she agreed with the restoration of the damaged king's name as Shoshenq Meryamun, she noted the piece's features were more compatible with a later period, more specifically those of the reign of Shoshenq V in the mid-8th century BC. Moreover, the deities references in the text suggested to Meffre an association with Heracleopolis rather than Sais. Accordingly, she identified the Chief of Ma Pami as a son of Shoshenq V and as general of Heracleopolis in succession to Hemptah B, whose son Pasenhor B failed to succeed him in that capacity.

Unless he is to be identified as the obscure Tanite King Neferkare Pami II, who is currently placed a little later in the 8th century BC, the Chief of Ma Pami failed to succeed his father Shoshenq V on the throne.

If the Chief of Ma Pami governed Heracleopolis, he would have been a predecessor of King Peftjauawybaste, who submitted to the Kushite king Piye in c. 720 BC. If the Great Chief of Ma Pami governed Sais, after all, he would have been a predecessor of the Great Chief of the Ma Osorkon C, who in turn was succeeded by Tefnakhte, the great rival of the same Kushite king, Piye.

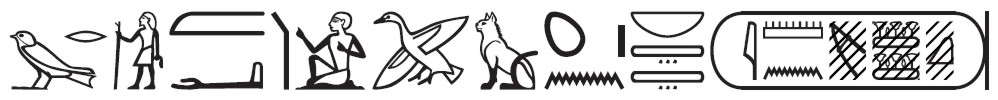
Title, name, and filiation of Pami.
