= Tadibast III =

- Divine mother, King's wife
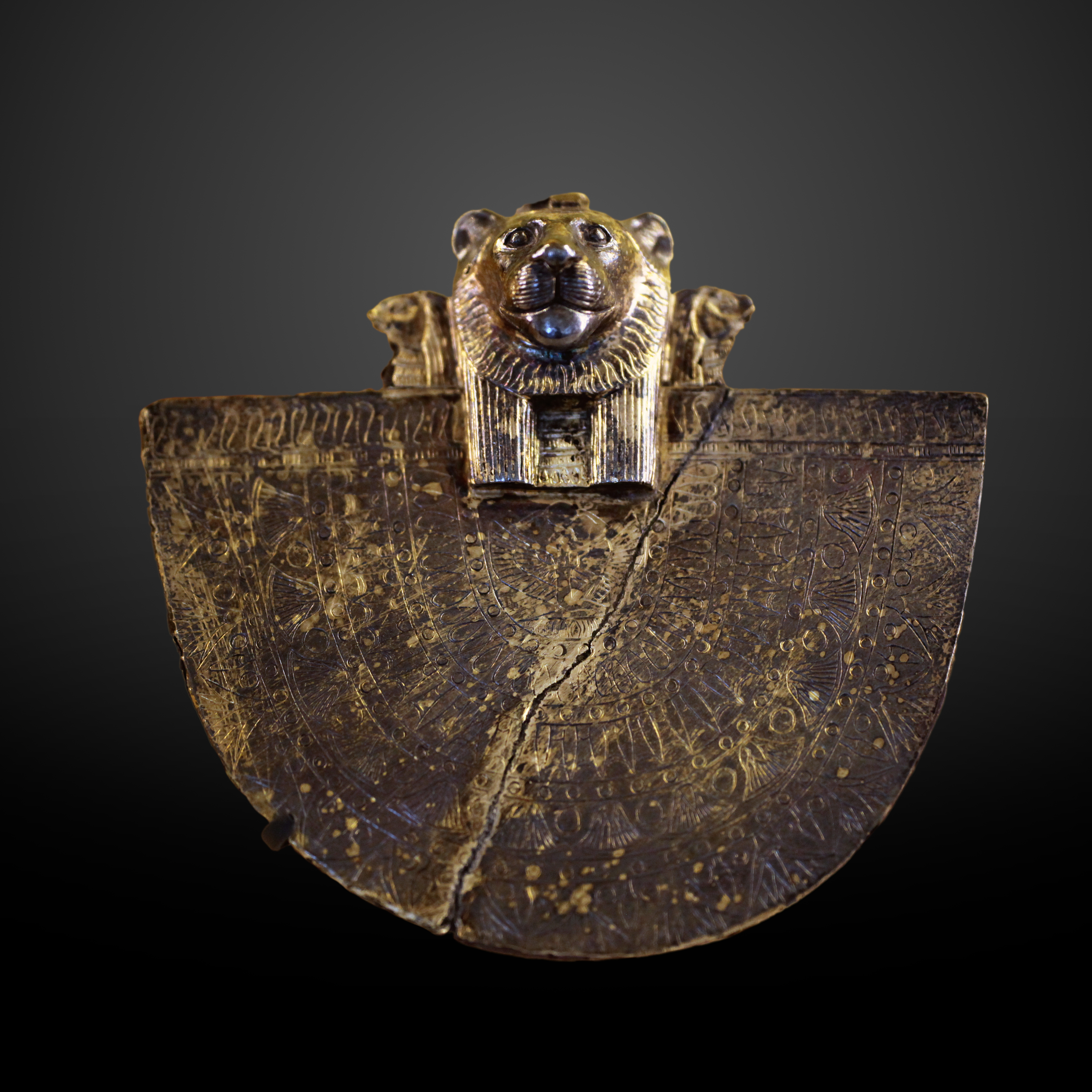
- Small aegis with the name of Tadibast and her son Osorkon, in the Louvre
- Spouse: possibly Shoshenq V
- Issue: Osorkon IV
Egyptian name
< N41 t M23 t G1 X8 W2 >
ḥmt-nswt Tȝ-di-Bȝstt
King's wife Tadibast(et)
- Dynasty: possibly 22nd Dynasty
- Religion: Ancient Egyptian religion

Tadibast (or Tadibastet) III was an ancient Egyptian queen consort during the late Third Intermediate Period, around the second half of the 8th century BCE.

== Identification ==
She is known only by an electrum aegis of Sekhmet from Bubastis and now on display at the Louvre. On the aegis Tadibast is called mwt-nTr ḥmt-nswt Tȝ-di-Bȝstt ˁnḫ-ti ("Divine mother, King's wife Tadibast(et), may she live"). Next to this inscription, another one simply reports "Son of Ra, Osorkon, forever", thus a pharaoh named Osorkon who is believed to have been her son.
Several kings named Osorkon are known, but the only one among these whose mother's name was still unknown is Osorkon IV, and it is generally assumed now that Tadibast III was indeed his mother.

On this basis, Tadibast's royal husband could have been king Shoshenq V of the 22nd Dynasty who was Osorkon IV's purported father and predecessor, but this identification is somewhat complicated due to the existence of the shadowy king Pedubast II whose reign is sometimes placed between Shoshenq V and Osorkon IV.
