= Jürgen von Beckerath =

German Egyptologist (1920–2016)

- Born: 19 February 1920; Hanover, Weimar Republic
- Died: 26 June 2016 (aged 96); Schlehdorf, Germany
- Occupations: Egyptologist and professor

Jürgen von Beckerath (19 February 1920 – 26 June 2016) was a German Egyptologist. He was a prolific writer who published countless articles in journals such as Orientalia, Göttinger Miszellen (GM), Journal of the American Research Center in Egypt (JARCE), Archiv für Orientforschung (AfO), and Studien zur Altägyptischen Kultur (SAK) among others. Together with Kenneth Kitchen, he is viewed as one of the foremost scholars on the New Kingdom and the Third Intermediate Period of Egypt.

His many popular German-language publications include Handbuch der Ägyptischen Königsnamen, 2nd edition (Mainz, 1999) and Chronologie des Pharaonischen Ägypten or "Chronology of the Egyptian Pharaohs," MÄS 46 (Philip von Zabern, Mainz: 1997), which is regarded by academics as one of the best and most comprehensive books on the chronology of Ancient Egypt and its various Pharaohs. In 1953, he personally inspected and recorded the Nile Quay Texts at Karnak before they were permanently lost or damaged through erosion.

== Academic contributions ==
Throughout his academic career, Beckerath maintained a high scholarly standard in his publications and articles and dispelled many previously held assumptions or beliefs by meticulously analyzing the original evidence.

=== Countering conventional regnal years in a stela ===
For instance, in a GM 154 (1996) paper, he examined and published a privately owned and poorly known stela, which dated to Year 22 of Osorkon II's reign and has frequently been called a Jubilee stela by academics (GM 154, pp. 19). Beckerath revealed, however, that this document did not mention any Sed festival or Jubilee celebrations for Osorkon II in this year as one would have expected if he had indeed celebrated his massive Jubilee Feast at this time. Instead, Beckerath demonstrated that the stela's text simply read: "Regnal Year 22 under the Majesty of the King of Upper and Lower Egypt, Usermaatre Setepenamun (i.e., Osorkon II), son of Re, the Appearance of the beloved Osorkon Meryamun" in the presence of the deities Osiris, Horus and Isis. (GM 154, p. 20). Osorkon II is shown being blessed by these gods in the stela.

In other words, the document was just a perfectly ordinary stela depicting the king before this trinity of gods. Beckerath aptly notes that this new evidence casts serious doubt upon the idea that the damaged Sed Jubilee date in Osorkon II's Bubastis Festival Hall should be read as Year 22, rather than Year 30 of this pharaoh's reign (the latter reading is possible with some restoration of the damaged numeral) as Edward Wente noted in his 1976 JNES review of Kitchen's TIPE book. Beckerath's analysis thus undermined the conventional view that this king celebrated his Sed Jubilee in his 22nd Year and suggests that Osorkon II likely celebrated his first Jubilee Feast in his 30th Year instead. Traditionally, in Egypt, Sed Jubilee Feasts were held on the 30th Year of a king's reign as is evidenced by the practices of other 22nd Dynasty kings such as Osorkon I, Shoshenq III and Shoshenq V.

=== Shoshenq III contributions ===
In another article titled "Zur Datierung des Papyrus Brooklyn 16.205" in GM 140 (1994), pp. 15–17, Professor Beckerath argued that "the 49th regnal year of a king referred to in Pap. Brooklyn 16.205 [which] is generally ascribed to Shoshenq III of the 22nd Dynasty" and comes from a mummy bandage from Deir el-Bahari should be dated to Year 49 of the 21st dynasty king Psusennes I instead because "it is unlikely that private persons from Upper Egypt [would] refer to this late year of Shoshenq III." Shoshenq III is known to have lost effective control of Upper Egypt after his 8th Year when Pedubast I proclaimed himself king here. All mentions of Shoshenq III after his 8th Year in Upper Egypt are associated with the serving High Priest of Amun, Osorkon B. After the 1993 discovery of a new Tanite king named Shoshenq IV who ruled Egypt for a minimum of 10 years in the 13-year interval from Year 39 of Shoshenq III to Year 1 of Pami, Kenneth Kitchen accepted von Beckerath's proposal in the introduction to the latest (1996) edition of his book, The Third Intermediate Period of Egypt (c. 1100-650 BC). Kitchen writes that this new royal arrangement (i.e.: Shoshenq III->Shoshenq IV->Pami) means that "Papyrus Brooklyn 16.205 of a Year 49 followed by a Year 4 must now be attributed to the time of Psusennes I and Amenemope, not to Shoshenq III and Pimay. [i.e. Pami] (cf. 103, §83 below)" (Kitchen, TIPE 1996, p. xxvi).

=== Positioning the reign of Shoshenq II ===
Beckerath also advocated the view that Shoshenq II enjoyed an independent reign at Tanis in his book Chronologie des Pharaonischen Ägypten. This view is seconded by Norbert Dautzenberg among other scholars.

== Death ==
He died in June 2016 at the age of 96.

== Bibliography ==
- The dating of the Brooklyn Papyrus (Zur Datierung des Papyrus Brooklyn) 16.205," GM 140 (1994), pp. 15–17.
- The so-called Jubilee-stele of Osorkon II ("Die Angebliche Jubiläums-Stele Osorkons II,") GM 154 (1996), pp. 19–22.
- Manual of names of Egyptian royalty (Handbuch der Ägyptischen Königsnamen,) MÄS 49, Philip Von Zabern. (1999)
- Chronology of the Egyptian pharaohs (Chronologie des Pharaonischen Ägypten,) Mainz am Rhein: Verlag Philipp von Zabern. (1997)
- The Date of the End of the Old Kingdom of Egypt in Journal of Near Eastern Studies 21 Vol. 2 (1962), pp.140-147
