= Ankhhor =

- Great Chief of the Libu
Egyptian name
S34 G5
- Predecessor: Rudamun
- Successor: Tefnakht
- Dynasty: 22nd Dynasty
- Pharaoh: Shoshenq V
- Spouse: Tjankhebi
- Children: Horbes, Nebetnehutmehut

Ankhhor or Ankh-Hor was an ancient Egyptian “Great Chief of the Libu” during the late 22nd Dynasty.

== Rule ==
He is attested as Great Chief on a stela dating to the regnal year 37 of pharaoh Shoshenq V (c. 731 BCE), and was probably the successor of the Great Chief Rudamun, who is attested in year 30 of the same pharaoh.

The year 37 stela was found in the Serapeum of Saqqara, and was one among several stelae issued to commemorate the death of an Apis bull, the most famous among these being the Stela of Pasenhor. The aforementioned stela was offered by a priest of Ptah named Pasherenptah on behalf of both king Shoshenq V and Ankhhor, as well as the latter's son Horbes. This was interpreted as a sign of growing power of the Great Chiefs of the Libu which has exceeded their realm in the western Nile Delta up to Memphis.

Ankhhor is also attested on a stela from Thebes. On it, it is known that he was married with a lady Tjankhebi, and that he sent their daughter Nebetnehutmehut south to Karnak in order to make her become a chantress of Amun to serve the God's Wife of Amun Shepenupet I. Nebetnehutmehut's burial chamber was eventually found within Shepenupet's tomb at Medinet Habu.

Ankhhor's rule, however, was not recognized by everyone. Already in Shoshenq V's regnal year 36 – a year before Ankhhor's Serapeum stela – the unrelated prince of Sais, Tefnakht, was already claiming for himself the title of “Great Chief of the Libu”, a claim renewed two years later in Shoshenq's year 38. Since then, Ankhhor disappeared from records, and in a few years Tefnakht would claim the pharaonic titles, founding the 24th Dynasty.
