= Osorkon C =

C. 8th-century BCE Great Chief of the Ma

Osorkon
- Great Chief of the Ma
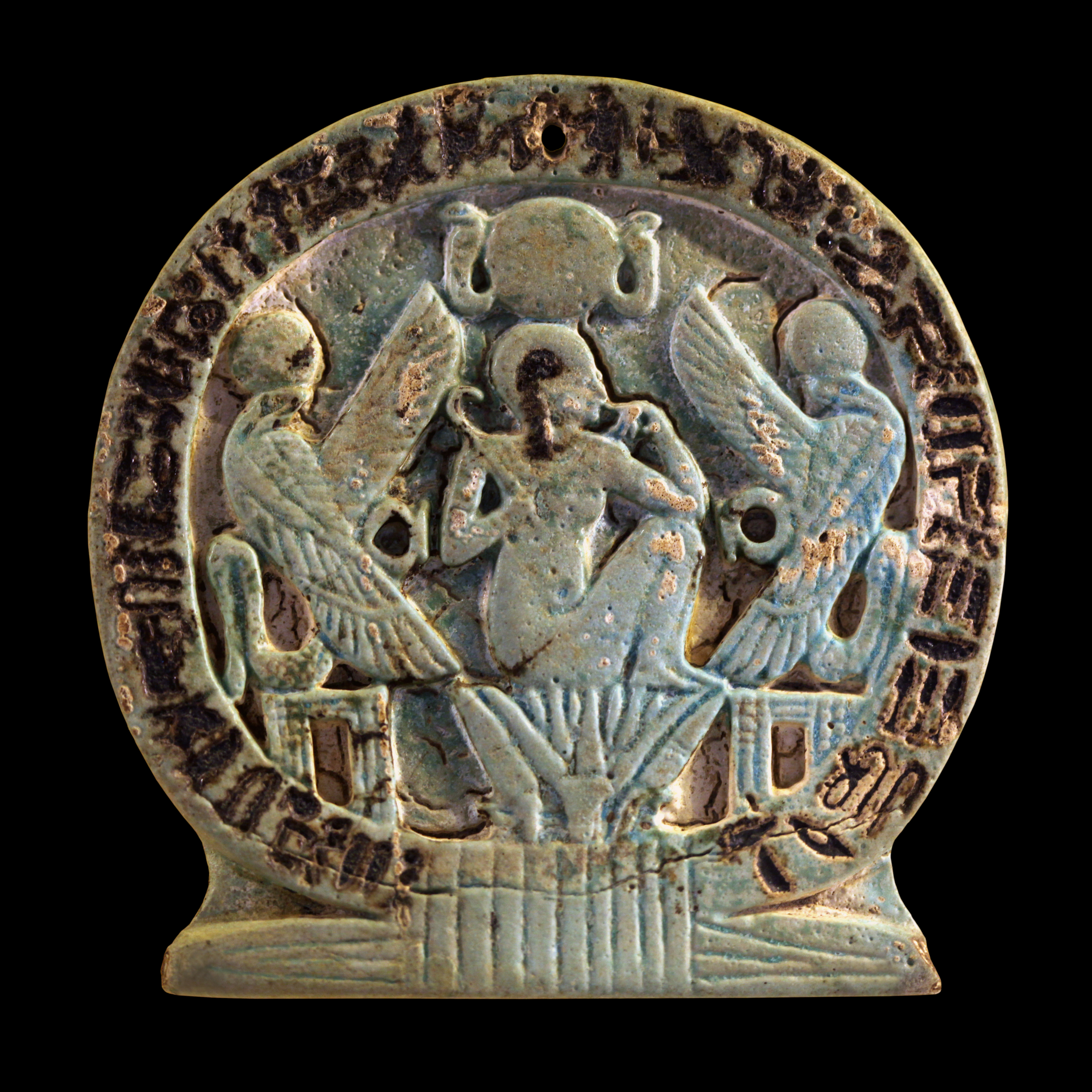
- The Talisman of Osorkon (Louvre E10943)
- Predecessor: Pimay (not directly)
- Successor: Tefnakht
- Dynasty: 22nd Dynasty
- Pharaoh: Shoshenq V

Osorkon C (also Osorkon of Sais) was a Great Chief of the Ma and a governor of Sais in Lower Egypt, during the 22nd Dynasty.

== Biography ==
Osorkon's ancestors are unknown; however, one of his close predecessors was prince Pimay, son of pharaoh Shoshenq III of the 22nd Dynasty. Osorkon is best known from the so-called "talisman of Osorkon" (Louvre E10943) – a faience amulet depicting the creation of the world with the god Ra-Horakhty as an infant, sitting on a lotus flower which rises from the primal waters – and also by some ushabti now in London. On the talisman, he is called Great Chief of the Ma, Army leader, Prophet of Neith, Prophet of Wadjet and of the Lady of Yamu (i.e. Hathor), showing that he ruled over the cities of Sais, Buto and Yamu respectively, in the end a considerable part of the Western Nile Delta.

Osorkon might have ruled c. 755 to c. 740 BCE, thus during the official reign of the late 22nd Dynasty pharaoh Shoshenq V. Osorkon was likely succeeded by the future pharaoh and founder of the 24th Dynasty, Tefnakht. In fact, in his early career Tefnakht held almost the same titles of Osorkon – plus other titles, most noticeably Great Chief of the Libu and Great Chief of the West – suggesting that he was his immediate successor. However, the two were apparently unrelated as Osorkon can't be identified with both Tefnakht's father and grandfather, whom were named Gemnefsutkapu and Basa respectively; this situation suggested that Osorkon was overthrown by Tefnakht.
