= Nesitaudjatakhet =

- Queen consort of Egypt
- Spouse: Pharaoh Sheshonk II
- Issue: Osorkon D
- Dynasty: 22nd of Egypt

Nesitaudjatakhet (Nesi-taudjat-akhet) was a wife of Pharaoh Sheshonk II and the mother of Prince Osorkon D. Nesitaudjatakhet and her son Osorkon are mentioned in papyrus Denon in Saint Petersburg.
