= Gemenefkhonsbak =

- Gemenefkhonsubak, Gemnefkhonsubak
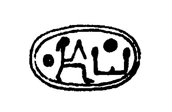
- Drawing by Flinders Petrie of a seal reading Shepeskare.

King of Tanis
- Reign: early 7th century BC
- Predecessor: Pami II ?
- Successor: Pedubast III ?
Royal titulary
Horus name
Sankhtawy
S-ˁnḫ-t3wj
The one who has sustained the Two Lands
G5	S29 S34 N19
Prenomen
Shepseskare Irenre
Špss-k3-Rˁ-jrj-n-Rˁ
The noble one of the ka of Ra, created by Ra

M23 X1 L2 X1	N5 A50 kA N5 D4 n
Nomen
Gemenefkhonsubak
Gm n.f ḫ.n.sw b3k
Khonsu has found for himself a servant

G39 N5	G28 n f Aa1 n M23 G29 V31
- Consort: Nebethetepetdiiau ?
- Children: Khonsusaes ? Pedubast III ?
- Father: Pami II ?

Shepseskare-irenre Gemenefkhonsbak was an ancient Egyptian king of the Tanite 23rd Dynasty.

== Evidence and interpretation ==
The evidence for King Gemenefkhonsubak comes almost entirely from inscriptions on blocs recovered from the ruins of Tanis. He was first recognized as a pharaoh by Pierre Montet, in his publication of inscribed blocs from the Sacred Lake of Amun at Tanis, although Serge Sauneron had already noticed his birth name on a stele. Kenneth Kitchen placed Gemenefkhonsbak's reign at Tanis sometime in c. 700–680 BC, commenting that his date was "wholly uncertain." He also characterized Gemenefkhonsbak as a "kinglet," probably reigning before the King Pedubast who was contemporary with the Assyrian interventions (in c. 670–667 BC).

Further consideration of the evidence from Tanis allowed the attribution of the Horus name Seankhtawy to Shepseskare-irenre Gemenefkhonsbak. This also makes it possible to assign him a probable wife, the King's Daughter and King's Wife Nebethetepetdiiau (Nb.t-ḥtp.t-dj-jȝw), and a daughter, the King's Daughter Khonsusaes (Ḫnsw-sȝ.s). Frédéric Payraudeau found the period between Year 6 of Taharqa (in 685 BC) and the attestations of Pedubast III by the Assyrians (in 671–667 BC) the most likely time for the reign of Gemenefkhonsbak and possibly other local kings at Tanis. In subsequent studies, Meffre and Payraudeau placed the newly identified King Neferkare Pami II as the successor of Osorkon IV at Tanis, leaving Gemenefkhonsbak as his eventual successor (possibly following a period of interruption under the Kushite 25th Dynasty), and had Gemenefkhonsbak succeeded immediately or eventually by Pedubast III. While some scholars identify Pedubast III with Sehetepibre Pedubast, Payraudeau identifies the latter as Pedubast II at the start of the Tanite 23rd Dynasty on the basis of geopolitical and stylistic considerations. A king with the throne name Sekhemkare (sharing the Horus name Seankhtawy with Gemenefkhonsbak) is considered as possibly intervening between Gemenefkhonsbak and Pedubast III, but instead may have reigned at Athribis rather than Tanis.

== Attestations ==
Few monuments bearing his name have been found. The better known among these is a hieratic stele from Heliopolis and now in the Museo Egizio of Turin; on this stele, this king is depicted while spearing a foreigner who lies before Osiris. According to Miroslav Verner, a scaraboid seal of unknown origin reading Shepeskare, which Flinders Petrie attributed to pharaoh Shepseskare of the 5th Dynasty at the beginning of the 20th century, may instead belong to Gemenefkhonsbak.

== Bibliography ==
- Aston, David A. 2009, Burial Assemblages of Dynasty 21-25: Chronology—Typology—Developments, Vienna: Österreichische Akademie der Wissenchaften.
- Beckerath, Jürgen von 1999, Handbuch der ägyptischen Königsnamen, Mainz am Rhein: Philipp von Zabern.
- Bonhême, Marie-Ange 1987, Les noms royaux dans l’Égypte de la troisième période intermédiaire, Cairo.
- Kitchen, Kenneth A. 1996, The Third Intermediate Period in Egypt (1100–650 BC), 3rd ed., Warminster: Aris & Phillips.
- Leprohon, Ronald J. 2013, The Great Name: Ancient Egyptian Royal Titulary, Atlanta.
- Meffre, Raphaëlle, and Frédéric Payraudeau 2018, "Enquête épigraphique, stylistique et historique sur les blocs du lac sacré de Mout à Tanis," Bulletin de la société française d'Égyptologie 199: 128-143.
- Meffre, Raphaëlle, and Frédéric Payraudeau 2019, "Un nouveau roi à la fin de l’époque libyenne: Pami II," Revue d'égyptologie 69: 147-158.
- Montet, Pierre 1952, Les énigmes de Tanis, Paris.
- Montet, Pierre 1966, Le lac sacré de Tanis, Paris.
- Payraudeau, Frédéric 2015, "La situation politique de Tanis sous la XXVeme Dynastie," in: P. Kousoulis, N. Lazaridis (eds.), Proceedings of the Tenth International Congress of Egyptologists, University of the Aegean, Rhodes, 22-29 May 2008 (OLA 241), Louvain: 849-860.
- Payraudeau, Frédéric 2020, L'Égypte et la vallée du Nil Tome 3: Les époques tardives (1069–332 av. J.-C.), Paris: Presses universitaires de France.
- Sauneron, Serge 1962, "Une stèle «égarée» du roi Gemnefkhonsoubak," Chronique d'Égypte 37: 291-292.
- Verner, Miroslav 2000, "Who was Shepseskara, and when did he reign?", in: Miroslav Bárta, Jaromír Krejčí (eds.), Abusir and Saqqara in the Year 2000, Academy of Sciences of the Czech Republic, Oriental Institute, Prague, ISBN 80-85425-39-4. available online.
