= Pedubastis =

Q3 D37 t t W1
P3-dj-Bstt
Padibastet
in hieroglyphs

Pedubastis or Petubastis, are Hellenized forms of the ancient Egyptian personal theophoric name Padibastet (alternatively Padibast or Pedubast) (P3-dj-Bstt), meaning 'Given by Bastet'. Notable bearers were:

- Pedubast I (r. 9th century BCE), a pharaoh of the 23rd Dynasty
- Pedubast II (r. 8th or 7th century BCE), a ruler of Tanis
- Pedubast III (r. 522 – 520 BCE), a rebel pharaoh during the 27th Dynasty
- Pedubast, a high steward during the 26th Dynasty

In addition, various kinglets of the Third Intermediate Period of Egypt bore the name Pedubastis.
