= Shoshenq V =

Egyptian pharaoh

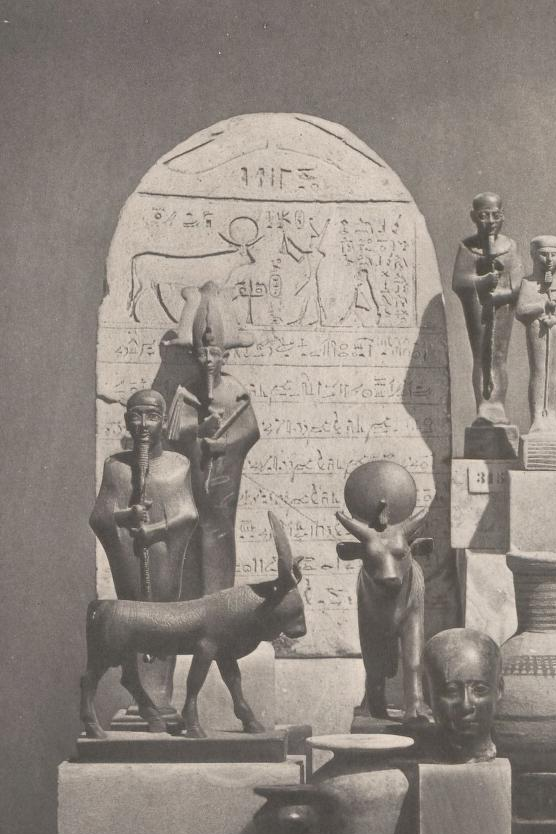
- In the background, Shoshenq V standing in front of an Apis bull on a stela of his Year 37.

Pharaoh
- Reign: c. 767–730 BC
- Predecessor: Pami
- Successor: Osorkon IV or Pedubast II
Royal titulary
Horus name
Woserpehty
wsr-pḥty
Great of Strength
G5	wsr s F9 F9
Nebty name
Woserpehty
wsr-pḥty
G16	wsr s F9 F9
Golden Horus
Woserpehty
wsr-pḥty
G8	wsr s F9 F9
Prenomen
Aakheperre
ˁȝ-ḫpr-Rˁ
Great is the Soul of Ra

M23 X1 L2 X1	N5 O29V L1
Nomen
Shoshenq
ššnq

G39 N5	M8 M8 W24 N29
- Consort: Tadibast III?
- Children: Osorkon IV? or Pedubast II?
- Father: Pami
- Died: c. 730 BC
- Dynasty: 22nd Dynasty

Aakheperre Shoshenq V was an ancient Egyptian pharaoh of the late 22nd Dynasty.

Despite having enjoyed one of the longest reigns of the entire dynasty – 38 years – and having left a fair amount of attestations, little is known about Shoshenq's life. His realm underwent an unstoppable shrinking due to the progressive increase of independence of various tribal chiefs, princes and concurrent kings, above all the pharaoh–to–be Tefnakht.

== Reign ==
=== Overview ===
The political situation in Egypt around 730 BC; at the end of his reign, Shoshenq V ruled above the North-Eastern territories coloured in grey

According to a Serapeum stela dated to his Year 11, Shoshenq was the son and successor of Pami. He ascended to the throne in ca. 767 BC and, despite little information about his life, he is well attested by several monuments, dated and not. However, the provenance of such findings is limited to the Eastern Nile Delta – in fact the territory under his authority – and noticeably, he is completely unrecorded in Thebes. Furthermore, it looks that during Shoshenq's reign his lordship above the city of Memphis and the westernmost part of his realms phased out for the benefit of the Libyan chiefs of the Western Delta such as Osorkon C and, ultimately, Tefnakht of Sais. At the end of his long reign – most likely lasting 38 years – Shoshenq ruled little more than the districts of Tanis and Bubastis.

Before the discovery of the proper Shoshenq IV, Shoshenq V was often referred to with the "IV" numeral (for example:).

=== Attestations ===
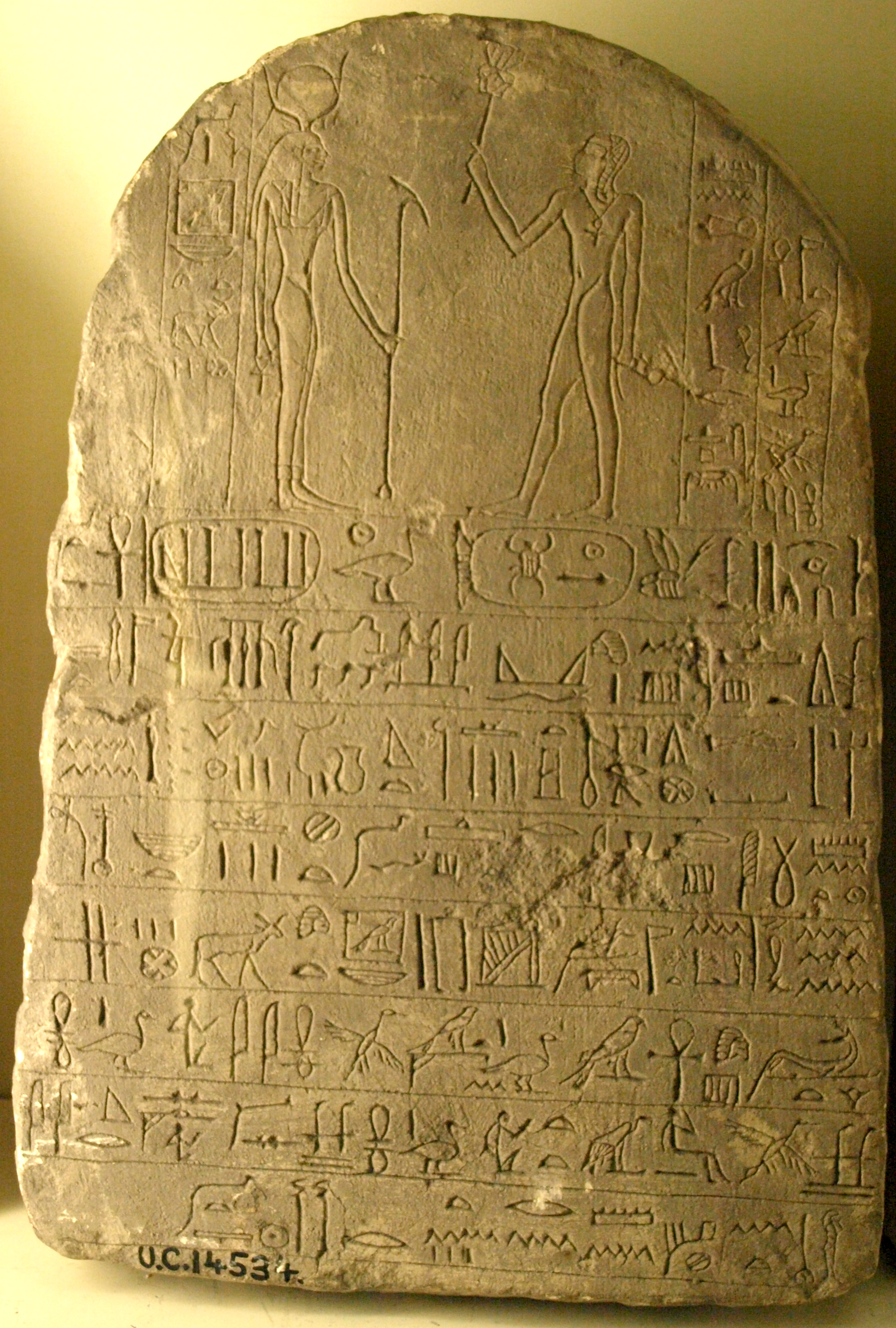
Limestone stele of Ankhhor dated to Year 22 of Shoshenq V

Shoshenq's Year 11 is recorded at Memphis, commemorating the death, burial and replacement of the Apis bull which was installed in the Year 2 of Pami. Shoshenq is also attested in his years 7 and 15 (or 17), 19, 30, and 37 by donation stelae of different Great Chiefs of the Libu, named Tjerpahati, Ker, Rudamun and Ankhhor respectively. Then, his name appears again on a stela from Atfih, dedicated to the goddess Hathor in Shoshenq's Year 22.

At Tanis, he ordered a temple for the Theban Triad, with particular emphasis on the god Khonsu. Probably in his Year 30, he also celebrated his Sed festival by adding a jubilee chapel to the aforementioned temple. These buildings were later dismantled and a sacred lake was made in their place. Yet, from the remains of the buildings, it is known that Shoshenq celebrated the festival by adopting brand-new Horus, Nebty and Golden Horus names, and by adding complements to his Throne and personal names, in sharp contrast with the plain and simple titulary used in most of his monuments (the one reported in the box) which was possibly a form of archaism. Undated monuments of Shoshenq V were unearthed at Tell el-Yahudiyeh.

In Year 37 of Shoshenq, the Apis bull installed in his Year 11 died and was buried. The event is commemorated on several Serapeum stelae, the most famous among these being the Stela of Pasenhor, which also provided a valuable genealogy of the early 22nd Dynasty and its Libyan origin. This bull eventually outlived Shoshenq, dying in Year 5 of pharaoh Bakenranef of the 24th Dynasty.

Shoshenq V's highest Year date is an anonymous Year 38 donation stela from Buto issued by Tefnakht (here boasting several titles, but not yet a pharaoh) which can only belong to his reign since Tefnakht was a late contemporary of this king. This stela, which reads simply as "Regnal Year 38 under the Majesty of the King of Upper and Lower Egypt, Lord of the Two Lands, [BLANK], Son of Re, [BLANK]," may reflect the growing power of Tefnakht in the Western Delta at the expense of Shoshenq V whose name is omitted from the document. The same argument can be applied to a similar stela, again issued by Tefnakht but in an anonymous Year 36 which again can only belong to Shoshenq's reign.

=== Death and political fragmentation ===
Shoshenq V died probably in 730 BC. Besides his father Pami, his family relationships are not entirely clear, but it is often assumed that his successor was Osorkon IV who also may have been his son. It is known that Osorkon's mother was queen Tadibast III; thus, she was possibly Shoshenq's queen. However, this reconstruction is complicated by the presence of the poorly known pharaoh Pedubast II who is sometimes placed as Shoshenq's successor. After Shoshenq V's death, the political fragmentation in the Delta region greatly accelerated as internal political struggles by local princes such as Tefnakht of Sais, Iuput II of Leontopolis and Nimlot of Hermopolis weakened and ended the 22nd Dynasty's control over Lower Egypt thereby creating a power vacuum since there was no local central power. This opened the way for Kushite intervention under Piye around 724 BC, as the squabbling local rulers failed to unify against the southern invasion by this Nubian king...and eventually, led to the creation of the Nubian Twenty-fifth Dynasty of Egypt under Piye's successor, Shebitku.

Preceded by Pami	Pharaoh of Egypt; 767 – 730 BC; Twenty-second dynasty of Egypt	Succeeded by Osorkon IV or Pedubast II
