= Pedubast II =

Sovereign

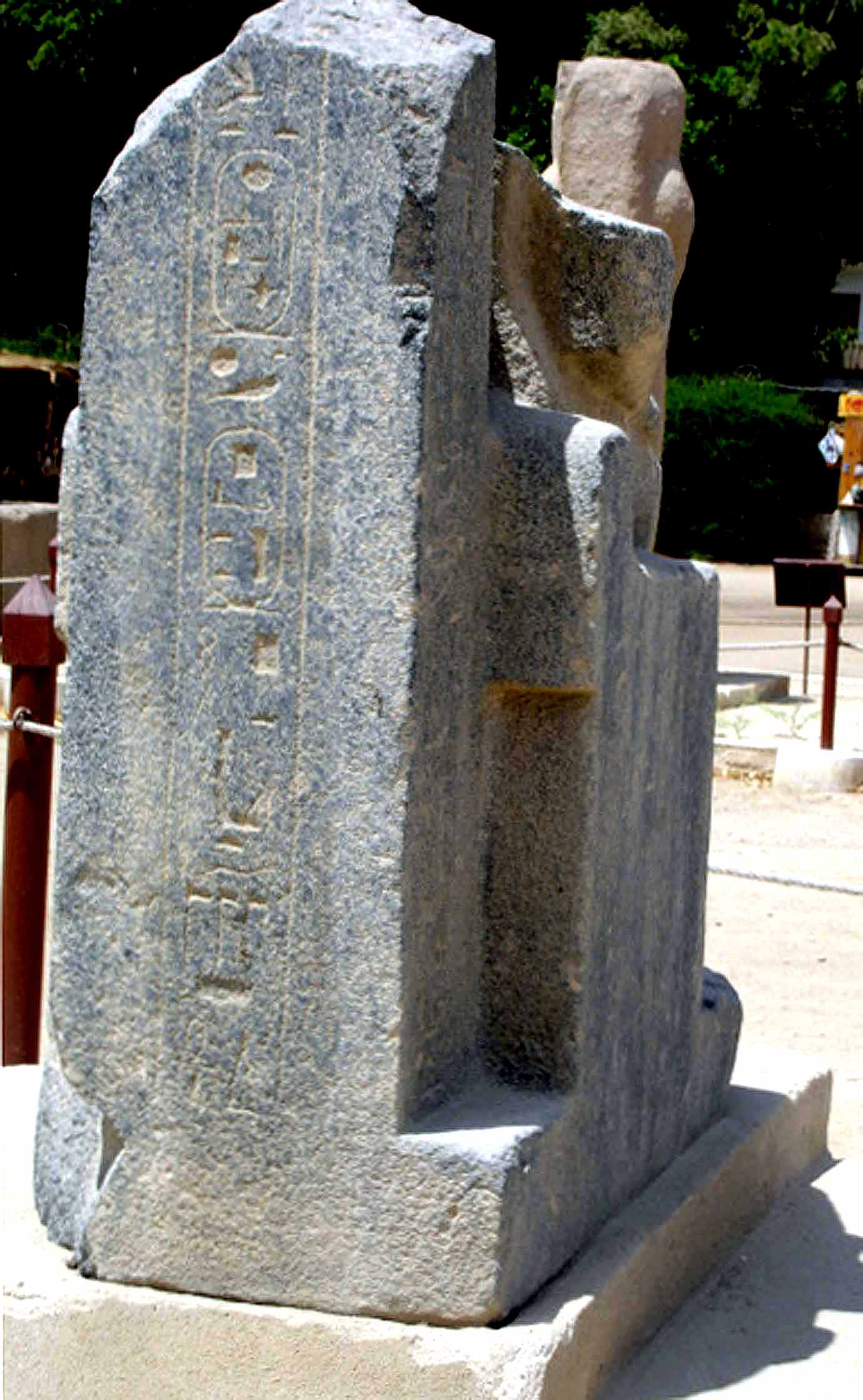
- Part of a statue bearing the titulary of Pedubast II, from Memphis.

Pharaoh
- Reign: 743–733 BC or 736–731 BC
- Predecessor: Shoshenq V or Osorkon IV
Royal titulary
Prenomen
Sehetepibenre

M23 X1 L2 X1	N5 S29 R4 X1 Q3 F34 N35
Nomen
Pedubast

G39 N5	p D37 W1 t t
- Father: Iuput II?

Pedubast II was a pharaoh of Ancient Egypt associated with the 22nd or more likely the 23rd Dynasty. Not mentioned in all King lists, he is mentioned as a possible son and successor to Shoshenq V by Aidan Dodson and Dyan Hilton in their 2004 book The Complete Royal Families of Ancient Egypt. They date his reign at about 743–733 BC, between Shoshenq V and Osorkon IV.

Jürgen von Beckerath places Pedubast II within the reign of Piye and in the 23rd Dynasty and proposes a reign of about 736–731 BC for this pharaoh. The exact length of Pedubast's II's reign is uncertain. Pedubast II may have been the son of Iuput II and the then serving nomarch in Athribis because the king list of Piye places next to Osorkon IV a Pedubast who is called a Prince of Athribis.

Pedubast's II's royal name or prenomen was Sehetepibenre and he is attested as a king at Tanis—or at least a local Delta ruler who controlled this city—by several stone blocks found there bearing his royal titulary. Kenneth Kitchen, however, prefers to date Pedubast II's kingship around the time of the Assyrian invasion under Esarhaddon and then Ashurbanipal in the mid-660s BC. Such is the degree of uncertainty surrounding this king's timeline during the Third Intermediate Period of Egypt (c. 1077 BC – 664 BC).
