= Shoshenq IV =

Egyptian pharaoh

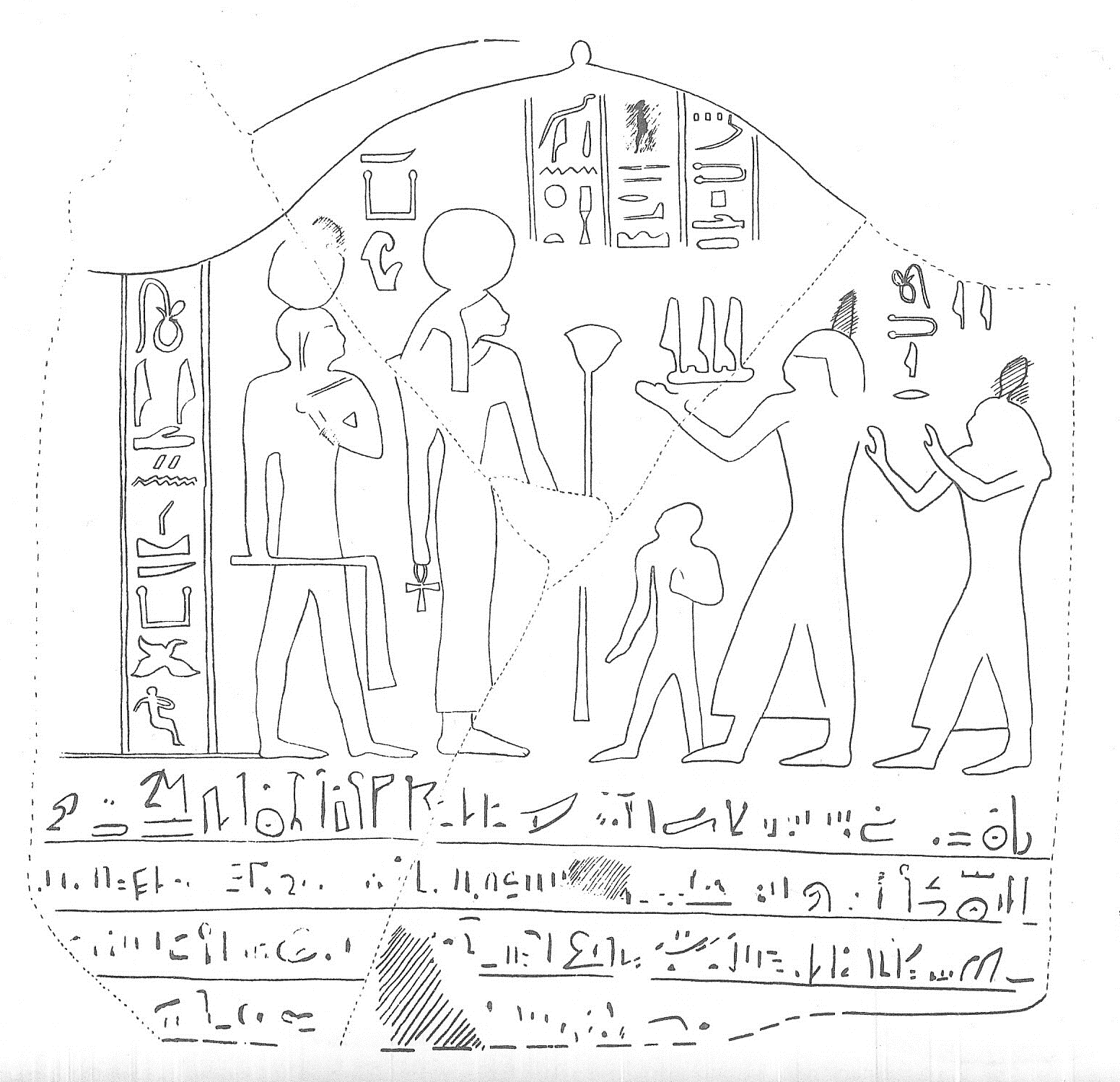
- Stela of the "Chief of the Libu" Niumateped, likely issued in regnal year 8 of Shoshenq IV

Pharaoh
- Reign: 798–785 BC
- Predecessor: Shoshenq III
- Successor: Pami
Royal titulary
Prenomen
Hedjkheperre Setepenre
ḥḏ-ḫpr-Rˁ stp.n-Rˁ
Radiant is the manifestation of Ra, the chosen one of Ra

M23 X1 L2 X1	N5 S1 L1 N5 stp n
Nomen
Shoshenq, Meryamun Sabast Netjerheqaiunu
Ššnq mrj-Jmn zȝ-Bȝstt nṯr hqȝ Iwnw
Shoshenq, beloved of Amun, son of Bast, divine ruler of Iunu

G39 N5	i mn n N36 H8 W2 M8 M8 n N29 N29 R8 S38 O28
- Burial: NRT V, Tanis
- Dynasty: 22nd Dynasty

Hedjkheperre Setepenre Shoshenq IV was an ancient Egyptian ruler of the 22nd Dynasty, between the reigns of Shoshenq III and Pami. In 1986, David Rohl proposed that there were two king Shoshenqs bearing the prenomen Hedjkheperre – (i) the well-known founder of the dynasty, Hedjkheperre Shoshenq I, and (ii) a later pharaoh from the second half of the dynasty, whom Rohl called Hedjkheperre Shoshenq (b) due to his exact position in the dynasty being unknown. Following a proposal (first suggested to him by Pieter Gert van der Veen in 1984), the British Egyptologist Aidan Dodson in 1993 supported the new king's existence by demonstrating that the earlier Hedjkheperre Shoshenq bore simple epithets in his titulary, whereas the later Hedjkheperre Shoshenq's epithets were more complex.

Dodson suggested that the ruler that Kenneth Kitchen, in his standard work on Third Intermediate Period chronology, had numbered Shoshenq IV – bearing the prenomen Usermaatre – should be removed from the 22nd Dynasty and replaced by Rohl's Hedjkheperre Shoshenq (b), renumbering the latter as Shoshenq IV. At the same time the old Usermaatre Shoshenq IV was renumbered as Shoshenq VI. Dodson's historical summary of the new King Shoshenq IV's discovery and his supportive evidence for that king's independent existence from Hedjkheperre Shoshenq I appeared in an article entitled ‘A New King Shoshenq Confirmed?’ in 1993.

Rohl and Dodson's combined arguments for the existence of a new 22nd Dynasty Tanite king called Hedjkheperre Shoshenq IV are accepted by Egyptologists today, including Jurgen von Beckerath and Kitchen – the latter in the preface to the third edition of his book on The Third Intermediate Period in Egypt.

As Dodson pointed out, while Shoshenq IV shared the same prenomen as his illustrious ancestor Shoshenq I, he is distinguished from Shoshenq I by his use of an especially long nomen – Shoshenq-meryamun-sibast-netjerheqaon which featured both the sibast ('son of Bast') and netjerheqaon ('god-ruler of Heliopolis') epithets. These two epithets were only gradually employed by the 22nd Dynasty pharaohs, starting from the reign of Osorkon II. By contrast, Shoshenq I's nomen simply reads ‘Shoshenq-meryamun’. Shoshenq I's immediate successors, Osorkon I and Takelot I also never used epithets beyond the standard ‘meryamun’ (beloved of Amun). In his 1994 book on the Canopic Equipment of the Kings of Egypt, Dodson observes that when the sibast epithet ‘appears during the dynasty of Osorkon II’, it is rather infrequent, while the netjerheqawaset ('god-ruler of Thebes') and netjerheqaon epithets are only exclusively attested ‘in the reigns of that monarch’s successors’ – that is Shoshenq III, Pami and Shoshenq V. This suggests that the newly identified Hedjkhperre Shoshenq IV was a late Tanite-era king who ruled in Egypt either during or after the reign of Shoshenq III.

Rohl had already pointed out in 1989 that the cartouches of a Hedjkheperre Shoshenq appear on a stela (St. Petersburg Hermitage 5630) dated to Year 10 of the king. This stela mentions a Great Chief of the Libu, Niumateped, who is also attested in a Year 8, usually attributed to Shoshenq V. Since the title ‘Chief of the Libu’ is only documented from Year 31 of Shoshenq III onwards, it seems this new king must have ruled contemporary with or after Shoshenq III. Dodson noted that the Hedjkheperre Shoshenq on the stela bore the long form titulary, now attributed to Hedjkhperre Shoshenq IV, thus confirming that the stela cannot be dated to Hedjkheperre Shoshenq I.

In his 1993 paper, Dodson proposed to place Shoshenq IV's reign after the last attested regnal date for Shoshenq III in Year 39, arguing that the discovery of Shoshenq IV's burial in the tomb of Shoshenq III at Tanis makes it likely that he was part of the 22nd Dynasty Tanite line. Dodson would therefore place Hedjkheperre Shoshenq IV between Shoshenq III and Pami.

== Burial ==
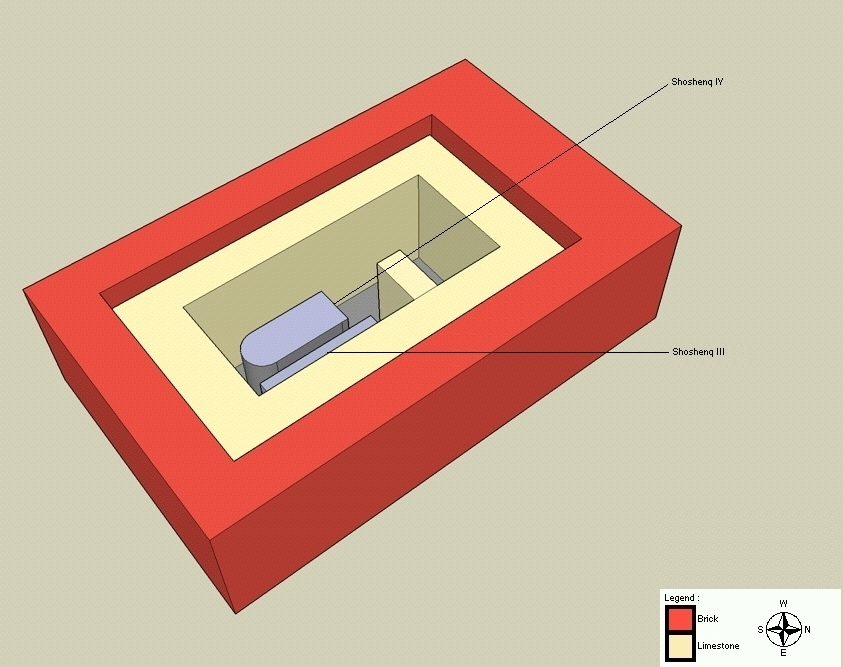
A rendering of the tomb NRT V, showing the two sarcophagi.

Excavation work in the looted NRT V Tanite tomb of Shoshenq III revealed the presence of two sarcophagi: one inscribed for Usermaatre-setepenre Shoshenq III and the other being an anonymous sarcophagus. The unmarked sarcophagus, however, ‘was clearly a secondary introduction’ according to its position in the tomb. In the Tanite tomb's debris, several fragments were found from one or two canopic jars bearing the cartouches of a Hedjkheperre Shoshenq. Rohl had pointed out that the Staatliche Museum in Berlin possessed a canopic chest for Hedjkheperre Shoshenq I and that these jars from the tomb of Shoshenq III were too large to fit inside the Berlin canopic chest. Rohl ‘used the evidence of the jars as the key element of his theory that there were indeed two Hedjkheperre Shoshenqs’. Dodson noted that the Tanite canopic vessels bear the name ‘Hedjkheperre-Setpenre-meryamun-sibast-netjerheqaon’ and, since the epithet netjerheqaon ('god ruler of Heliopolis') was never employed by the 22nd Dynasty kings until the reign of Shoshenq III, this is clear evidence that the new Shoshenq IV was buried in Shoshenq III's Tanite tomb and must have succeeded this king. It also establishes that the king buried in the second sarcophagus in Shoshenq III's tomb was certainly not Shoshenq I. Dodson was initially reluctant to accept Rohl's proposal for a second Hedjkheperre Shoshenq but his own research into the archaeological evidence led him to revise his opinion:

Having implicitly rejected such a conclusion in 1986, further study of the canopic fragments as part of my general treatment of royal canopics has now led me rather to support the existence of two Shoshenqs with the prenomen Hedjkheperre.

This is now the mainstream consensus view within Egyptology.

Preceded by Shoshenq III	Pharaoh of Egypt; 798 – 785 BC; Twenty-second dynasty of Egypt	Succeeded by Pami
