= Brooklyn Papyrus =

Brooklyn Papyrus may refer to:

- Brooklyn Medical Papyrus
- Brooklyn Oracle Papyrus
- Papyrus Brooklyn 35.1446
- Papyrus Brooklyn 37.1799 E
- Brooklyn Museum 37.1784Ea–b, fragments of the Rhind Mathematical Papyrus
