= Iuput II =

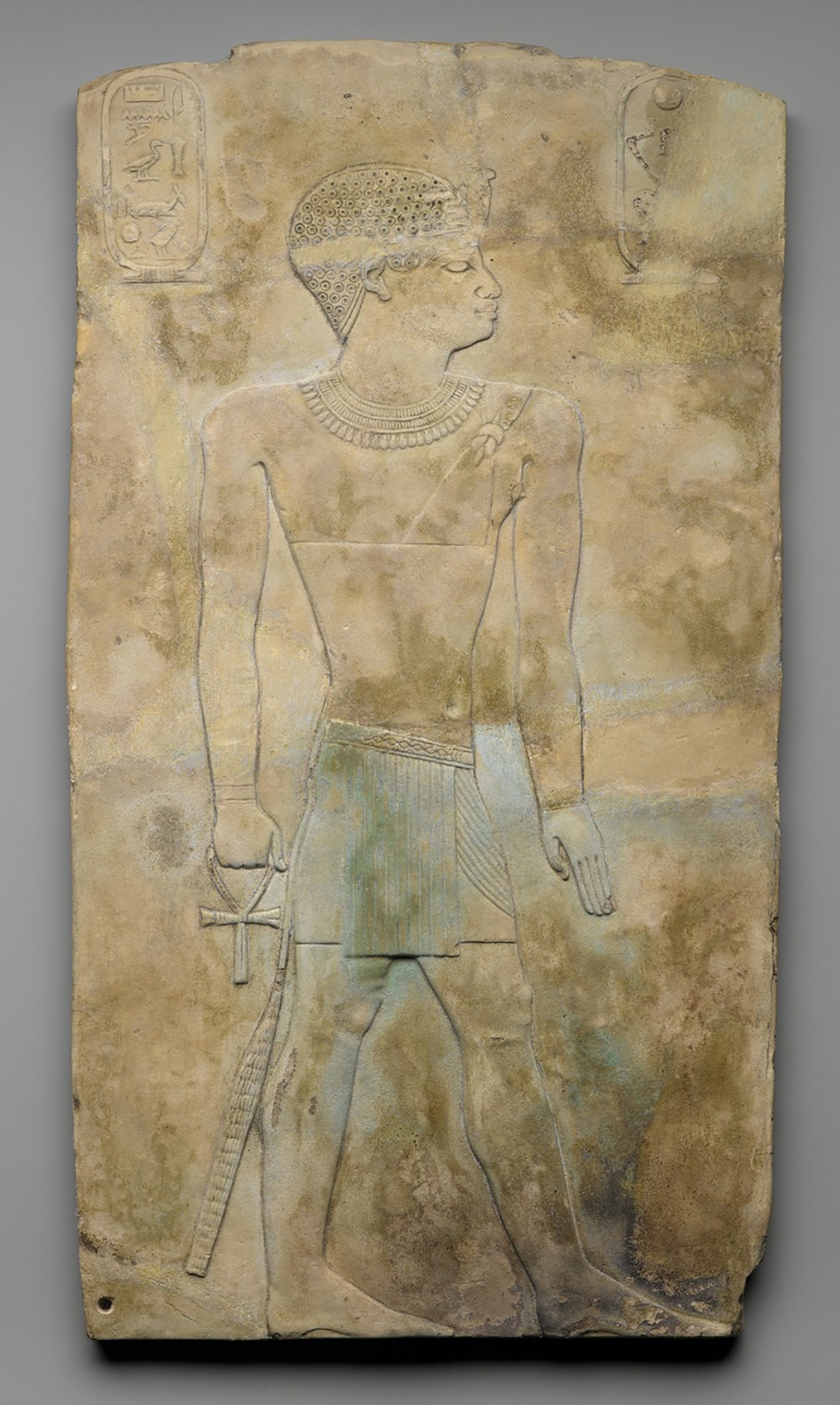
- Plaque of Iuput II. Third intermediate period, c. 754-720/715 BC, in the Brooklyn Museum in New York City

King of Leontopolis
Royal titulary
Prenomen
Usermaatre-setepenamun
"The Maat of Ra is powerful, chosen by Ra"

M23 X1 L2 X1	N5 i wsr C10 mn stp n
Nomen
Iuput-sibast-meryamun
"Iuput, son of Bast, beloved by Amun"

G39 N5	mn n U7 i G39 W1 E9 w p t
- Consort: Tent-kat?

Iuput II (also spelled Auput II) was a ruler of Leontopolis, in the Nile Delta region of Lower Egypt, who reigned during the 8th century BC, in the late Third Intermediate Period.

== Reign ==
He was an ally of Tefnakht of Sais who resisted the invasion of Lower Egypt by the Kushite king Piye. Iuput II ruled during a chaotic time of the Third Intermediate Period when several kings controlled Lower Egypt, including Osorkon IV at Bubastis and prince Tefnakht at Sais.

Year 21 of Iuput II is attested on a stela from Mendes. The respected British Egyptologist Kenneth Kitchen states that this dated stela which features the great chief of the Ma Smendes, son of Harnakht and ruler of Mendes, bears Iuput's name but lacks his royal name or prenomen. However, the clear Lower Egyptian provenance of the stela can be associated with several monuments that name "a king Usermaatre Setepenamun (var. Setepenre), Iuput Si-Bast, from the Delta" which means Iuput II's throne name was Usermaatre-setepen-amun/re. The Year 21 stela of Iuput II was fully published in 1982.

After Piye defeated Tefnakht's coalition and conquered Lower Egypt around Year 20 of his reign, the Nubian king permitted Iuput II to remain in power as a local governor of Leontopolis according to his Victory Stela from Jebel Barkal.

== Monuments ==
The Mendesian stela of Iuput II is dated to his 21st year. Other monuments or objects from his reign include "a statue-base of Usimare Setepenamun, Iuput Meryamun Si-Bast from Tell el Yahudieh, a glazed plaque (see picture) now in the Brooklyn Museum, and a bronze door-hinge...from Tell Moqdam (Leontopolis) bearing identical titles of the king along with [a] mention of the Chief Queen, Tent-kat [...] and some obscure epithets."

=== Iuput II's archaising plaque ===
The Brooklyn Museum plaque is peculiar because it depicts Iuput II in a style which differs a lot from the standards of the Third Intermediate Period: instead of having a long-legged, slender figure, Iuput is shorter and more muscular, a proportion which is reminiscent of the Old Kingdom art. For this reason, the plaque has been considered proof that the archaising tendencies which were believed to have originated in Nubia and spread in Egypt during the 25th Dynasty, are in fact earlier and originating from the Delta, with Kushite (and later Saite) artists merely adopting an already existing trend.
