= Pami =

Egyptian pharaoh

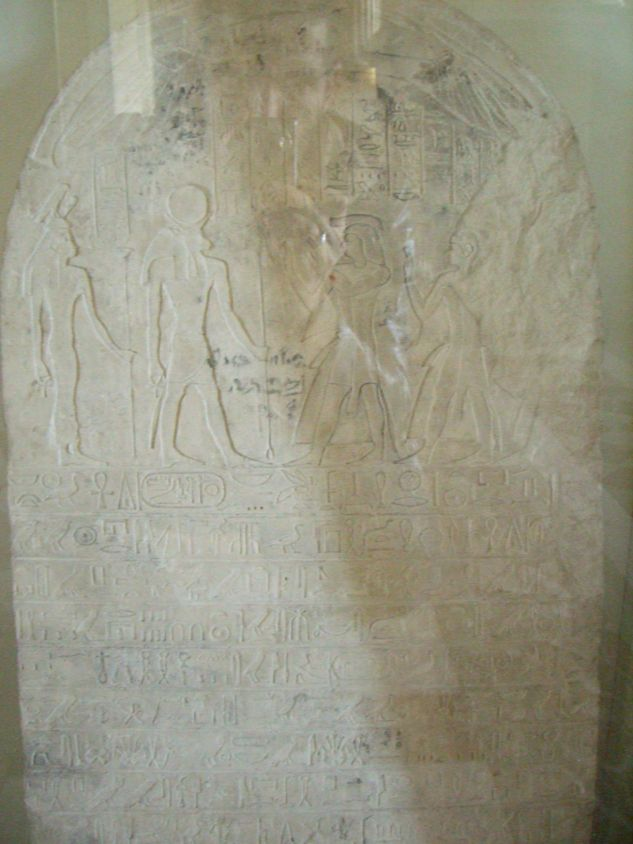
- Year 2 Apis stela from Pami's reign found in Saqqara. Louvre

Pharaoh
- Reign: 785 – 778 BC
- Predecessor: Shoshenq IV
- Successor: Shoshenq V
Royal titulary
Prenomen
Usermaatre Setepenre (var. Setepenamun)
Wsr-Mȝˁt-Rˁ stp.n-Rˁ
Powerful is the Maat of Ra, chosen of Ra (Amun)

M23 X1 L2 X1	ra wsr mAat ra stp n
Nomen
Pami meryamun
Pȝ-my mrj-Jmn
The cat, beloved of Amun

G39 N5	M17 Y5 n N36 G40 W19 M17 M17
- Burial: NRT II, Tanis
- Dynasty: 22nd Dynasty

Usermaatre-setepenre Pami-meryamun (Egyptian wsr-mȝʿt-rʿ stp-n-rʿ pȝ-my mrj-jmn) was an ancient Egyptian pharaoh of the 22nd Dynasty who ruled for 7 years. "Pami" in Egyptian, means "the Cat" or "He who belongs to the Cat [Bastet]".

== Identity ==
Pami's precise relationship with his immediate predecessor Shoshenq IV is unknown. He is attested as the father of Shoshenq V in a stela from the Serapeum of Saqqara, dating to the eleventh year of the latter's reign.

Pami was once assumed to be Pimay, the third son of Shoshenq III who served as the "Great Chief of Ma" under his father. However, the different orthographies of their names (Pami vs. Pimay) prove that they were 2 different individuals.

The name Pami translates as 'The Cat' in Egyptian whereas the name Pimay means 'The Lion.' Pami's name was mistakenly transcribed as Pimay by past historians based upon the identification with Shoshenq III's son. While a previous Dynasty 22 king held the title 'Great Chief of the Ma' before ascending the throne–namely Shoshenq I–Shoshenq III's son, if Pimay did indeed outlive his father, he should have then succeeded his father as king rather than the obscure Shoshenq IV who is not attested as a son of Shoshenq III. Consequently, it seems certain that Shoshenq III outlived all of his sons through his nearly four-decade-long reign.

While a minority of scholars hold to the traditional view that Pami was Pimay, no archaeological evidence proves that Pami was ever a son of Shoshenq III. Pami may have been a son of his obscure predecessor Shoshenq IV instead.

== Reign length ==
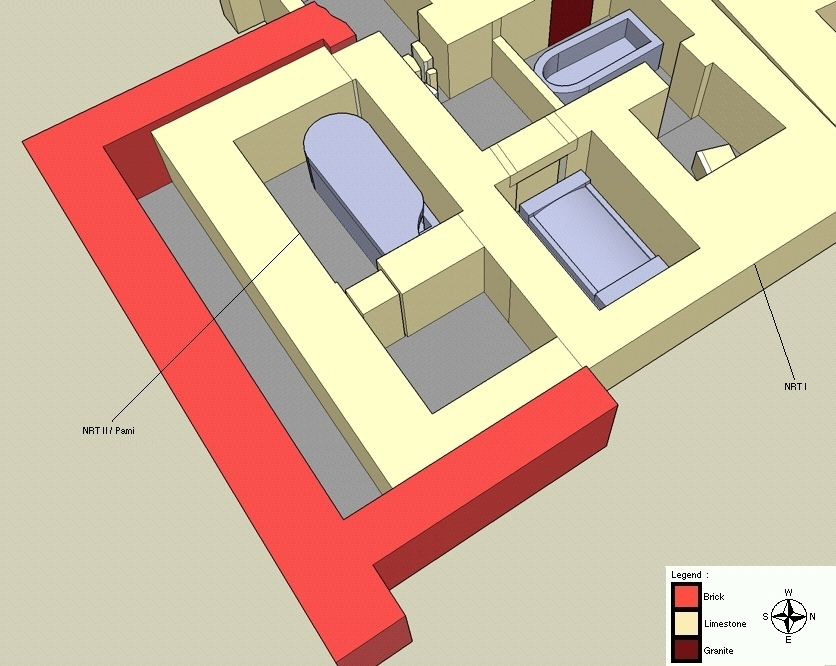
Restored view of Pami's burial chamber in tomb NRT II, Tanis

According to stelae discovered from the Serapeum of Saqqara, an Apis bull was buried in the second year of Pami's reign. Pami's fourth year is known from Brooklyn papyrus ‘16.205.’ A small votive stela (Louvre C 275) presumably from Memphis reports a religious ceremony dated to Year 6 of king Pami's reign.

On a reused stone block from an enclosure wall at Heliopolis, annals were found which document the deeds of various Twenty-second Dynasty pharaohs, however, only the section concerning Pami's reign had survived. It chronicles the king's annual donations to both the gods of the Great Temple of Heliopolis and to other local deities and temples in this city. While the ending of the block is damaged, the donation of the 7th regnal year can be clearly seen for Pami, with an entry for the subsequent year being possible. Pami, therefore, could have reigned for nearly 7 full years.
