= Leontopolis =

Archaeological site in Egypt

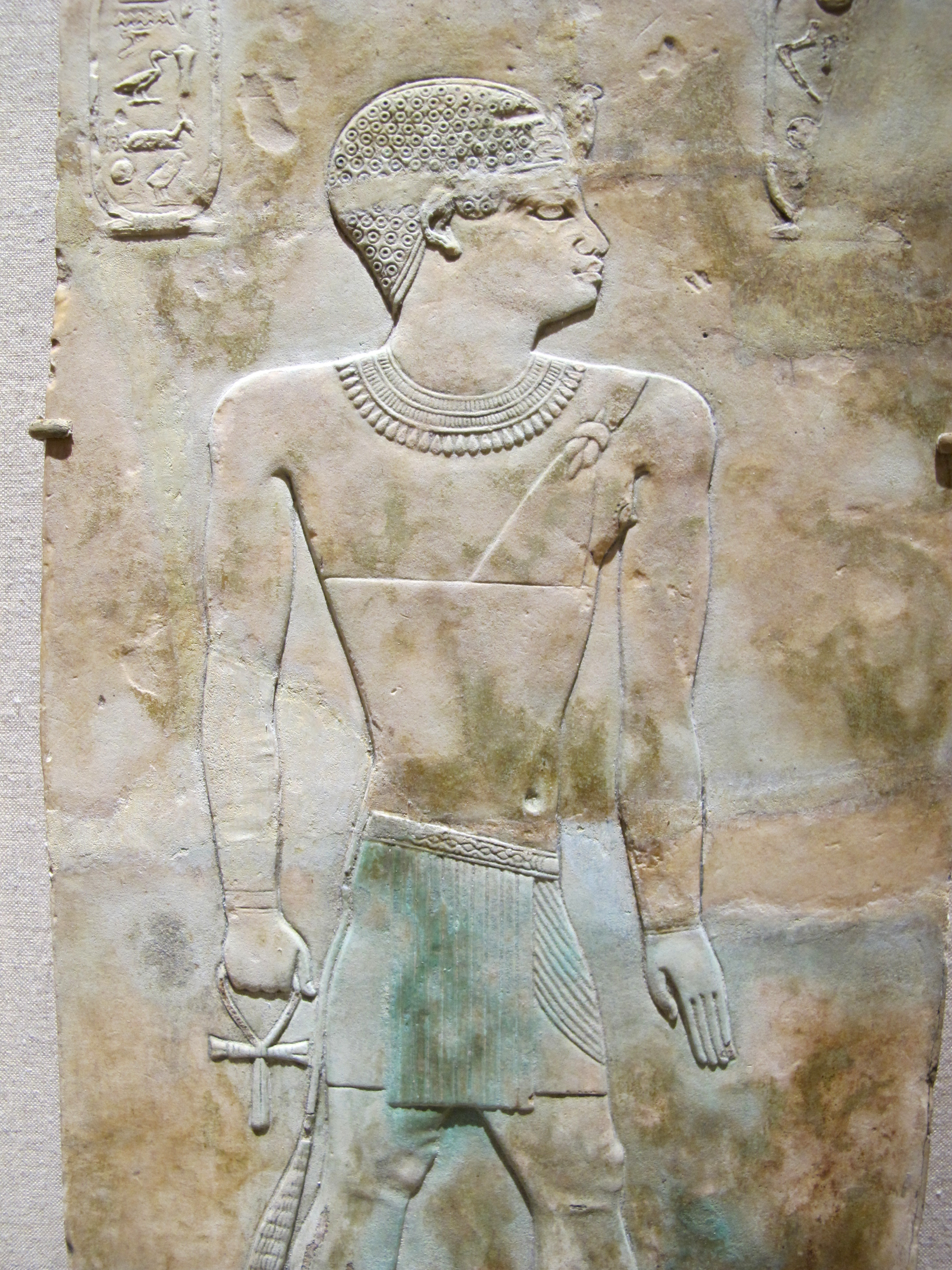
- Iuput II ruled over Leontopolis from 754 to 720/715 BCE

- Location within Egypt
- 30°41′N 31°21′E
- Location: Dakahlia Governorate, Egypt

Leontopolis was an ancient Egyptian city located in the Nile Delta, Lower Egypt. It served as a provincial capital and Metropolitan Archbishopric. The archaeological site and settlement are known today as Kafr Al Muqdam.

== Name ==
Known most popularly in the modern era and to scholarship by its traditional Greek name Leontopolis Λεόντων πόλις (literally, "city of lions"), or Leonto Λεοντώ, ("lion"), the demographic makeup of the city varied culturally and linguistically over its long history, and the Greek name was progressively used more and more over the native Egyptian Taremu ("Land of Fish"). After the annexation of Ptolemaic Egypt as a Roman province, the city retained the Greek name, and was referred to in Latin sources as the oppidum Leontos, though the Egyptian name still lingered among primary speakers of Coptic Egyptian into the post-classical period. Today, the site itself is referred to in Arabic as Tell el-Muqdam ("mound of the city").

== History ==
The city is located in the central part of the Nile Delta region. It was the capital of the 11th nome of Lower Egypt (the Leontopolite nome) and was probably the centre of pharaonic power under the 23rd dynasty. In his conquest-stela found at the fourth Nile Cataract at Jebel Barkal, Piye writes about his conquest over Iuput II, who ruled over Leontopolis. Strabo is the earliest writer who mentions either the nome, or its chief town: and it was probably of comparatively recent origin or importance.

The Greek name of this city means "City of Lions", given on account of the presence of temples to the lioness goddesses Bast and Sekhmet, and their son, Maahes, the lion prince. Live lions were kept at the temples during the time of the Greek occupation.

It became the capital of the Roman province of Augustamnica Secunda.

== Ecclesiastical history ==
As provincial capital it also was a Metropolitan archbishopric, known as Leontopolis in Augustamnica, which was to fade.

- Michel Le Quien lists Theodotus at the second Council of Constantinople in 553AD.

and

- Metrodorus of Leontopolis signed the cannon of the Council of Ephesus.

=== Catholic Titular see ===
The diocese was restored nominally in the 18th century, as titular bishopric, erroneously called Leontopolis in Bithynia, and as such had the following incumbents of fitting episcopal (lowest) rank :

- Elias Daniel von Sommerfeld (1714.01.26 – 1742.07.26)
- Joaquim de Nossa Senhora de Nazareth Oliveira e Abreu, Friars Minor (O.F.M.) (1815.09.04 – 1819.08.23)
- Alexander Dobrzański (1819.12.17 – 1831?)
- Ludwig Forwerk (1854.07.11 – 1875.01.08)

It was promoted circa 1880 to titular archbishopric of Metropolitan rank; it was renamed in 1925 Leontopolis, in 1933 Leontopolis in Augustamnica. It has had the following incumbents, of fitting (Metropolitan? archiepiscopal) rank :

- Jean-Pierre-François Laforce-Langevin (1891.02.06 – 1892.01.26)
- Dominique-Clément-Marie Soulé (1893.03.21 – 1919.04.21)
- Andrea Cassulo (1921.01.24 – 1952.01.09)
- Terence McGuire (1953.11.16 – 1957.07.04)
- Angelo Ficarra (1957.08.02 – 1959.06.01)
- Cornelius Bronsveld, White Fathers (M. Afr.) (1959.12.21 – 1970.11.30)

=== Greek Orthodox Titular See ===
- Dionysios (Hatzivasiliou) 1997-2012
- Gabriel of Leontopolis 2012 - Present

== Identification ==
Most scholars today agree that Leontopolis is located at Tell al Muqdam, at latitude 30° 45′ North.

Researchers were long divided as to the real site of Leontopolis. According to D'Anville (1697–1782), its ruins were covered by a mound called Tel-Essabè (Tel es-sab`), or the "Lion's Hill". Jomard (1777–1862), on the other hand, maintained that some tumuli near the village of El-Mengaleh in the Delta, represent the ancient Leontopolis, and this supposition agrees better with the account of the town given by Xenophon of Ephesus. W. Smith (1813–1893) locates the city at latitude 30° 6′ North, which is considerably further south than the actual site.

== See also ==
- List of ancient Egyptian towns and cities

== Sources and external links ==
Printed sources

- Richard Talbert, Barrington Atlas of the Greek and Roman World, (ISBN 0-691-03169-X), p. 74.
- Hans Bonnet: Leontopolis (2.), in: Lexikon der ägyptischen Religionsgeschichte, Hamburg 2000 ISBN 3-937872-08-6 S. 423.
- W. M. Flinders Petrie: Hyksos and Israelite Cities, London 1906.
- Max Küchler: Leontopolis in: Religion in Geschichte und Gegenwart. Handwörterbuch für Theologie und Religionswissenschaft. (RGG) 4. Auflage, Mohr Siebeck, Tübingen 2002, S. 274.

External links

- Leontopolis article at JewishEncyclopedia.com
- GCatholic with titular incumbent bio links
- Herbermann, Charles, ed. (1913). "Leontopolis" . Catholic Encyclopedia. New York: Robert Appleton Company.

Preceded by Bubastis	Capital of Egypt; 818 - 715 BC	Succeeded by Sais
