= Twenty-second Dynasty of Egypt =

Ancient Egyptian dynasty (947–713 BC)

- 947 BC – 713 BC
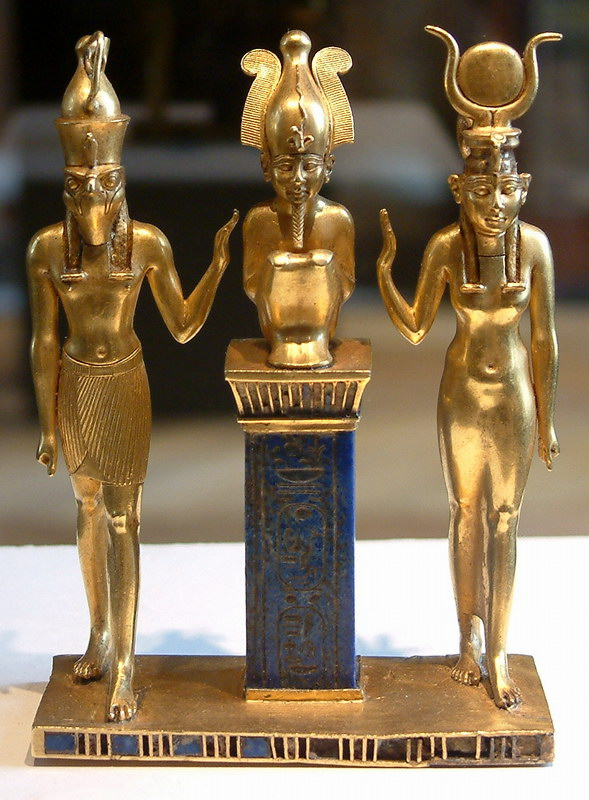
- Pendant bearing the cartouche of Osorkon II. Seated Osiris flanked by Horus and Isis
- Capital: Bubastis, Tanis
- Common languages: Egyptian language
- Religion: Ancient Egyptian religion
- Government: Absolute monarchy
- Historical era: Third Intermediate Period of Egypt
  - Established: 947 BC
  - Disestablished: 713 BC
Preceded by
Twenty-first Dynasty of Egypt
Succeeded by
Twenty-third Dynasty of Egypt
Twenty-fourth Dynasty of Egypt
Twenty-fifth Dynasty of Egypt

The Twenty-second Dynasty was an Ancient Egyptian dynasty of 947–713 BC, during the Third Intermediate Period. The dynasty was founded by Shoshenq I, who was of ancient Libyan origin. It is also known as the Bubastite Dynasty as the pharaohs originally ruled from the city of Bubastis.

== Rulers ==
The pharaohs of the Twenty-second Dynasty were a series of Meshwesh (ancient Libyan (Note: The term "Libya" in Egyptology refers to the areas west of the Nile valley.) tribe) chieftains, who ruled from c. 947 BC until 713 BC. They had settled in Egypt since the Twentieth Dynasty and were known in Egypt as the 'Great Chiefs of the Ma' (Ma being a synonym of Meshwesh). Manetho states that this Egyptianized ancient Libyan dynasty first ruled over Bubastis, but its rulers almost certainly governed from Tanis, which was their capital and the city where their tombs have been excavated.

Another pharaoh who belongs to this group is Tutkheperre Shoshenq. His period of rule within this dynasty is currently uncertain, although he is now thought to have governed Egypt early in the 9th century BC for a short time between Osorkon I and Takelot I. The next ruler at Tanis after Shoshenq V was Osorkon IV. This pharaoh is sometimes not believed to be a member of the 22nd Dynasty since he only controlled a small portion of Lower Egypt together with Tefnakhte of Sais, whose authority was recognised at Memphis—and Iuput II of Leontopolis.

=== Pharaohs ===
The known rulers during the Twenty-second Dynasty include:

Dynasty XXII Kings of Egypt
Pharaoh	Image	Prenomen (Throne name)	Horus-name	Reign	Consort(s)	Comments
Shoshenq I		Hedjkheperre-Setepenre	Kanakhtmeryre Sekhaefemnesuersematawy	947–922 BC	Patareshnes; Karomama A	Possibly to be identified with the biblical Shishak
Osorkon I		Sekhemkheperre-Setepenre	Kanakhtmeryre Redjensuitemuhernesetefergeregtawy	922–887 BC	Maatkare B Tashedkhonsu; Shepensopdet A	
Shoshenq II		Heqakheperre-Setepenre	(unknown)	887–885 BC	Nesitanebetashru; Nesitaudjatakhet	Enjoyed an independent reign of two years at Tanis according to Von Beckerath
Takelot I		Hedjkheperre-Setepenre	(unknown)	885–872 BC	Kapes	
Osorkon II		Usermaatre-Setepenamun	Kanakhtmerymaat	872–837 BC	Isetemkheb G Karomama B Djedmutesankh	Possibly one of the twelve kings who formed an alliance to fight Shalmaneser III of Assyria at the battle of Qarqar in 853 BC.
Shoshenq III		Usermaatre-Setepenre	Kanakhtmesutre	837–798 BC	Tadibast II; Tentamenopet; Djedbastiusankh	
Shoshenq IV		Hedjkheperre-Setepenre	(unknown)	798–785 BC		Not to be confused with Shoshenq VI; the original Shoshenq IV in publications before 1993
Pami		Usermaatre-Setepenamun	(unknown)	785–778 BC		Buried two Apis bulls in his reign
Shoshenq V		Akheperre	Userpehty	767–730 BC	Tadibast III?	Successor of Shoshenq V was often stated as Osorkon IV;some say it is Pedubast II
Pedubast II		Sehetepibenre	(unknown)	743–733 BC	Tadibast III?	Not mentioned in all Pharaoh lists, placement disputed
Osorkon IV		Usermaatre	(unknown)	730–713 BC		Not always listed as a true member of the XXII Dynasty, but succeeded Shoshenq V at Tanis. Perhaps the biblical Pharaoh So (2 Kings 17:4).

==== Celebration and folklore ====
The rise to power of the Twenty-second dynasty and its founder Sheshqonq, a Libyan Berber king of the Meshwesh tribe abbreviated as Ma by ancient Egyptians according to Egyptologists, is remembered as year 0 of the Berber calendar celebrated by the Berber New Year each year: the Yennayer. The character is known as Ouchachnaq, hero of a Kabyle tale, "Sheshqonq and Mira", but is also mentioned in an ancient Berber nursery rhyme from the region under the name of Ouchnaq.

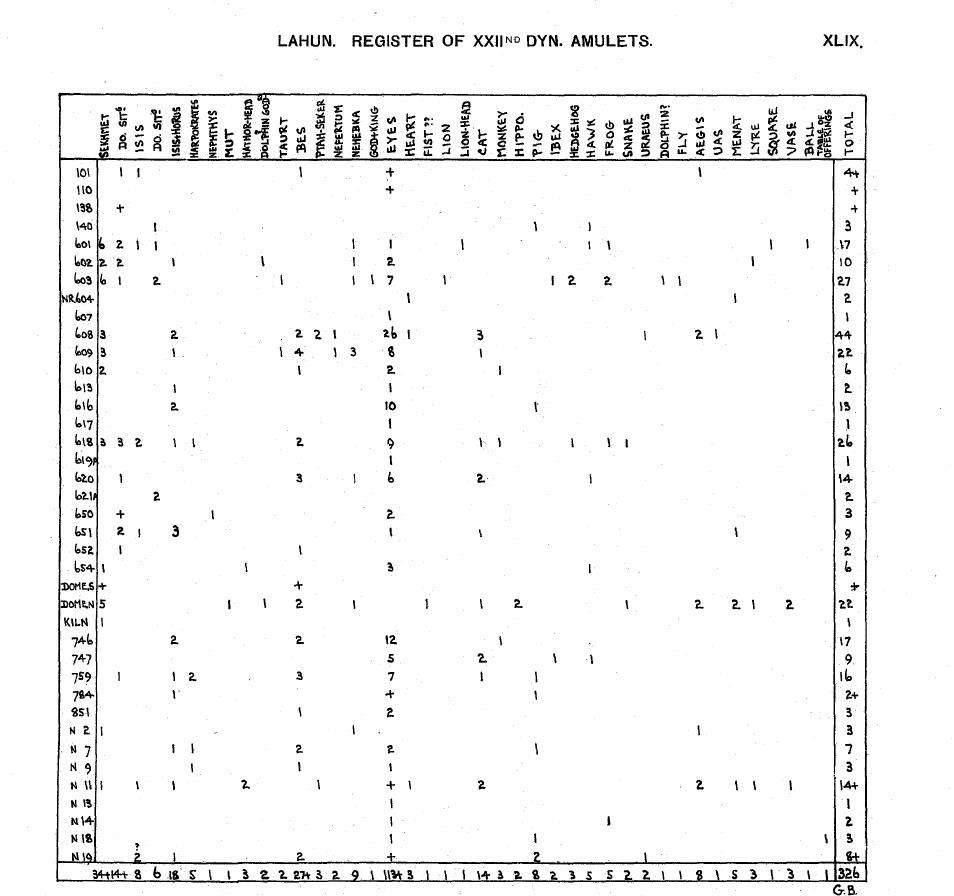

Twenty-third Dynasty

The so-called Twenty-third Dynasty was an offshoot of this dynasty perhaps based in Upper Egypt, though there is much debate concerning this issue. All of its kings reigned in Middle and Upper Egypt including the Western Desert Oases.

== See also ==
- Twenty-second dynasty of Egypt Family Tree

== Readings ==
- Gerard P.F. Broekman, Libyan Rule Over Egypt. The Influence of the Tribal Background of the Ruling Class on Political Structures and Developments during the Libyan Period in Egypt PDF, Studien zur Altägyptischen Kultur (SAK) 39 (2010), pp.85-99

Preceded by Twenty-first Dynasty	Dynasties of Egypt c. 947 BC–713 BC	Succeeded by Twenty-third Dynasty; Twenty-fourth Dynasty; Twenty-fifth Dynasty
