= Bubastis =

Archaeological site in Egypt

Tell-Basta
- Ⲡⲟⲩⲃⲁⲥϯ (Coptic) تل بسطة
- Bubastis; Per-Bast
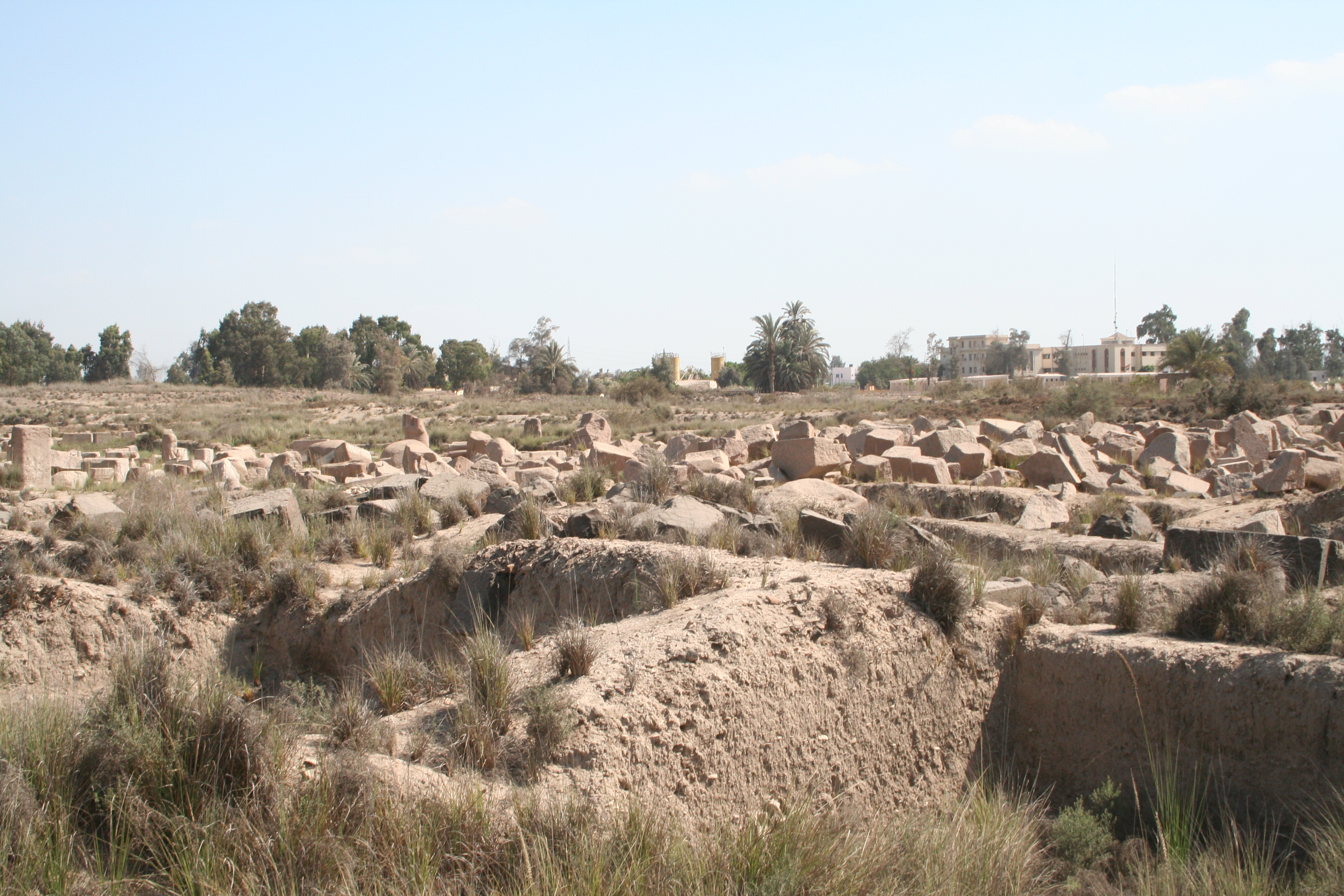
- View of Bubastis

- Location within Egypt
- 30°34′22″N 31°30′36″E
- Type: Settlement
- Location: Tell-Basta, Sharqia Governorate, Egypt
- Region: Lower Egypt

Site notes
- Condition: In ruins

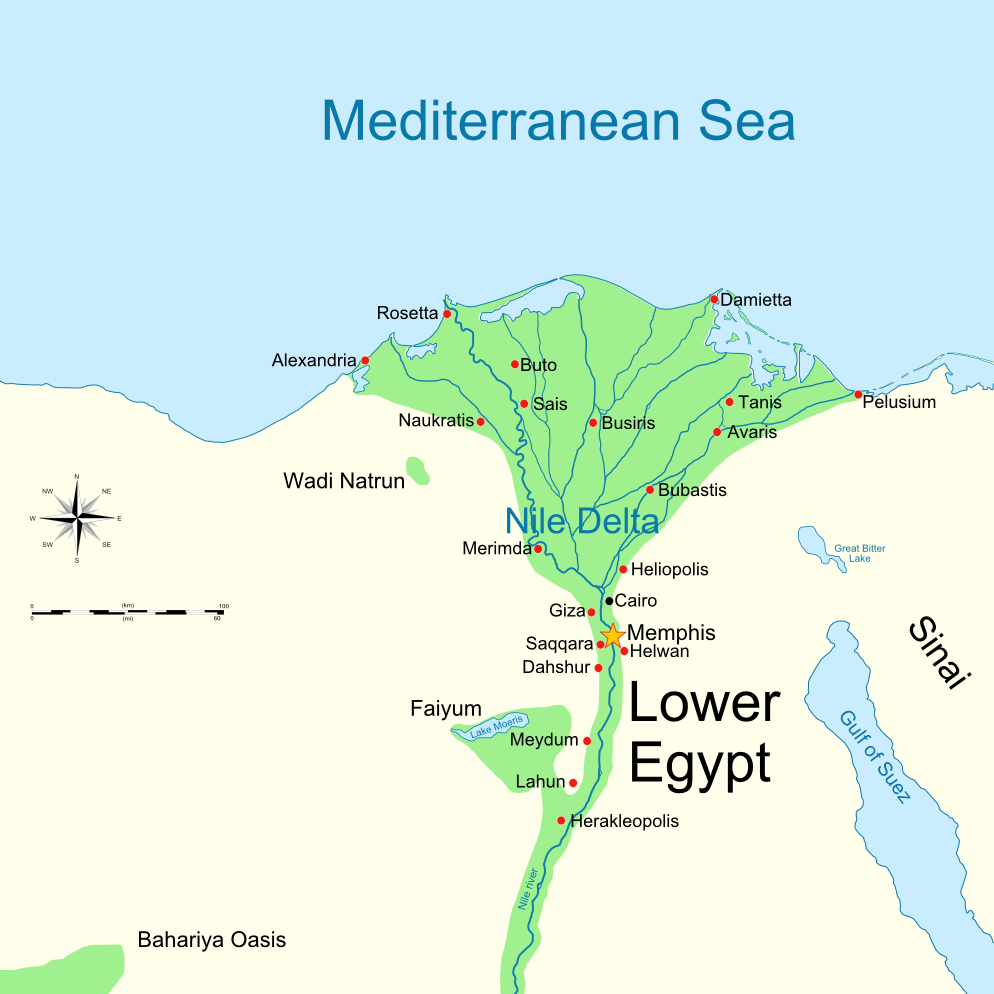
Map of ancient Lower Egypt showing Bubastis

bA st t niwt
Bubastis
in hieroglyphs

Bubastis (Bohairic Coptic: Ⲡⲟⲩⲃⲁⲥϯ Poubasti; Greek: Βούβαστις Boubastis or Βούβαστος Boubastos), also known in Arabic as Tell-Basta or in Egyptian as Per-Bast, was an ancient Egyptian city. Bubastis is often identified with the biblical Pi-Beseth (Hebrew: פי-בסת py-bst, Ezekiel 30:17). It was the capital of its own nome, located along the River Nile in the Delta region of Lower Egypt, and notable as a center of worship for the feline goddess Bastet, and therefore the principal depository in Egypt of mummies of cats.

Its ruins are located in the suburbs of the modern city of Zagazig.

== Etymology ==
The name of Bubastis in Egyptian is Pr-Bȝst.t, conventionally pronounced Per-Bast but its Earlier Egyptian pronunciation can be reconstructed as /ˈpaɾu-buˈʀistit/. It is a compound of Egyptian pr (“house") and the name of the goddess Bastet; thus the phrase means "House of Bast". In later forms of Egyptian, sound shifts had altered the pronunciation. In Bohairic Coptic, the name is rendered Ⲡⲟⲩⲃⲁⲥϯ, Ⲡⲟⲩⲁⲥϯ or Ⲃⲟⲩⲁⲥϯ.

== Cult of Bastet ==
Bubastis was centered on the Temple of Bastet (Pr-Bast; House of Bastet).

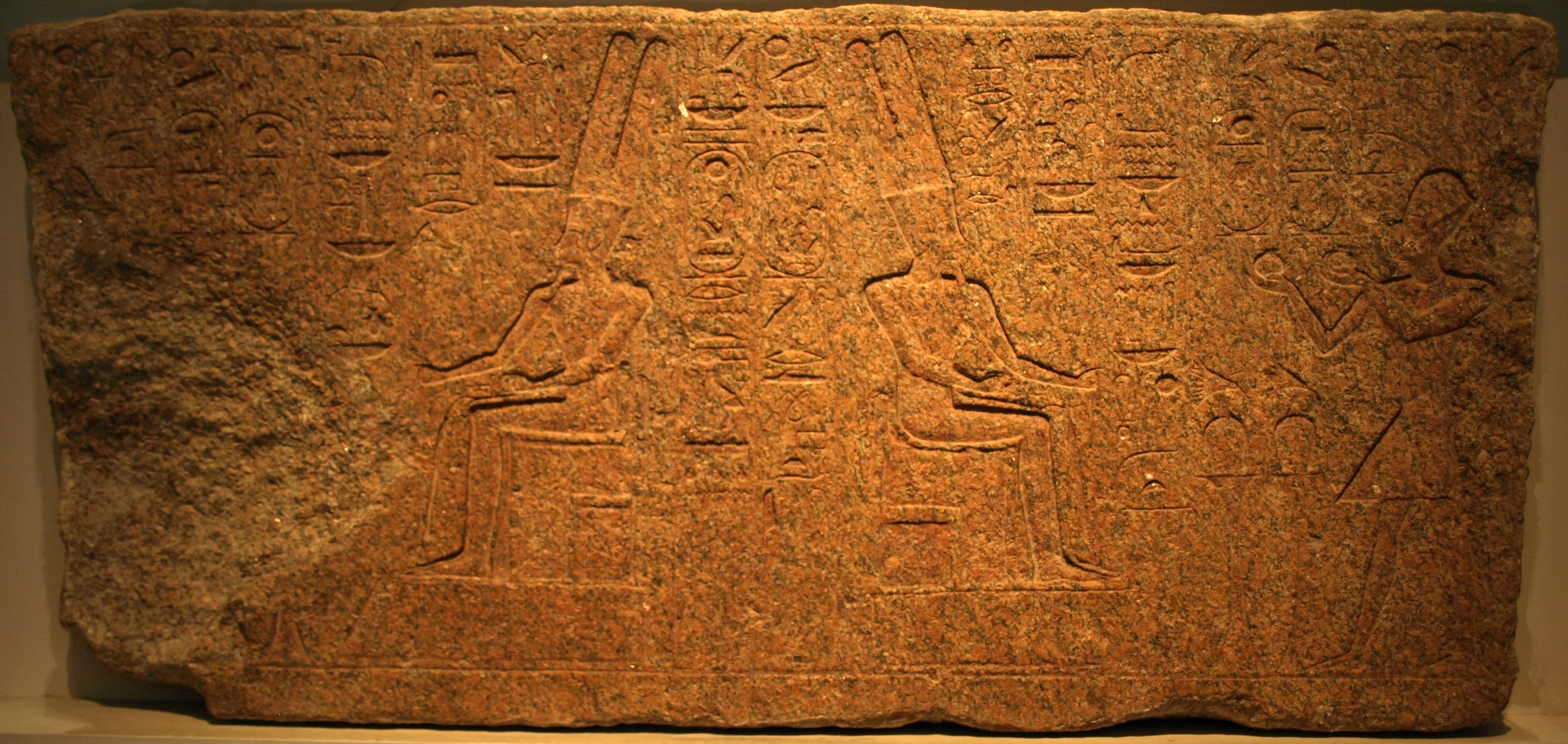
Relief of the pharaoh Amenhotep II, made of red granite. It depicts the pharaoh worshiping the god Amun. From the 18th Dynasty, circa 1430 BC, with an additional inscription by Seti I (circa 1290 BC). Originally from Bubastis, British Museum.

The Cult of Bastet worshipping the feline goddess Bastet developed and the city was sometimes called Bubastis after the city, who the Greeks identified with Artemis. Prior to the 1st millennium BCE, Bastet was always depicted as a lioness (cf. lioness goddesses such as Sekhmet and Shesmetet), later she became associated with the cat. The cat was the sacred and peculiar animal of Bast, who is represented with the head of a cat or a lioness and frequently accompanies the deity Ptah in monumental inscriptions. The tombs at Bubastis were accordingly the principal depository in Egypt of the mummies of the cat.

The most distinguished features of the city and nome of Bubastis were its oracle of Bast, the splendid temple of that goddess and the annual procession in honor of her. The oracle gained in popularity and importance after the influx of Greek settlers into the Delta, since the identification of Bast with Artemis attracted to her shrine both native Egyptians and foreigners.

The festival of Bubastis was considered the most joyous and gorgeous of all in the Egyptian calendar as described by Herodotus:

Barges and river craft of every description, filled with men and women, floated leisurely down the Nile. The men played on pipes of lotus. the women on cymbals and tambourines, and such as had no instruments accompanied the music with clapping of hands and dances, and other joyous gestures. Thus did they while on the river: but when they came to a town on its banks, the barges were made fast, and the pilgrims disembarked, and the women sang, playfully mocked the women of that town and threw their clothes over their head. When they reached Bubastis, then held they a wondrously solemn feast: and more wine of the grape was drank in those days than in all the rest of the year. Such was the manner of this festival: and, it is said, that as many as seven hundred thousand pilgrims have been known to celebrate the Feast of Bast at the same time.

== History ==
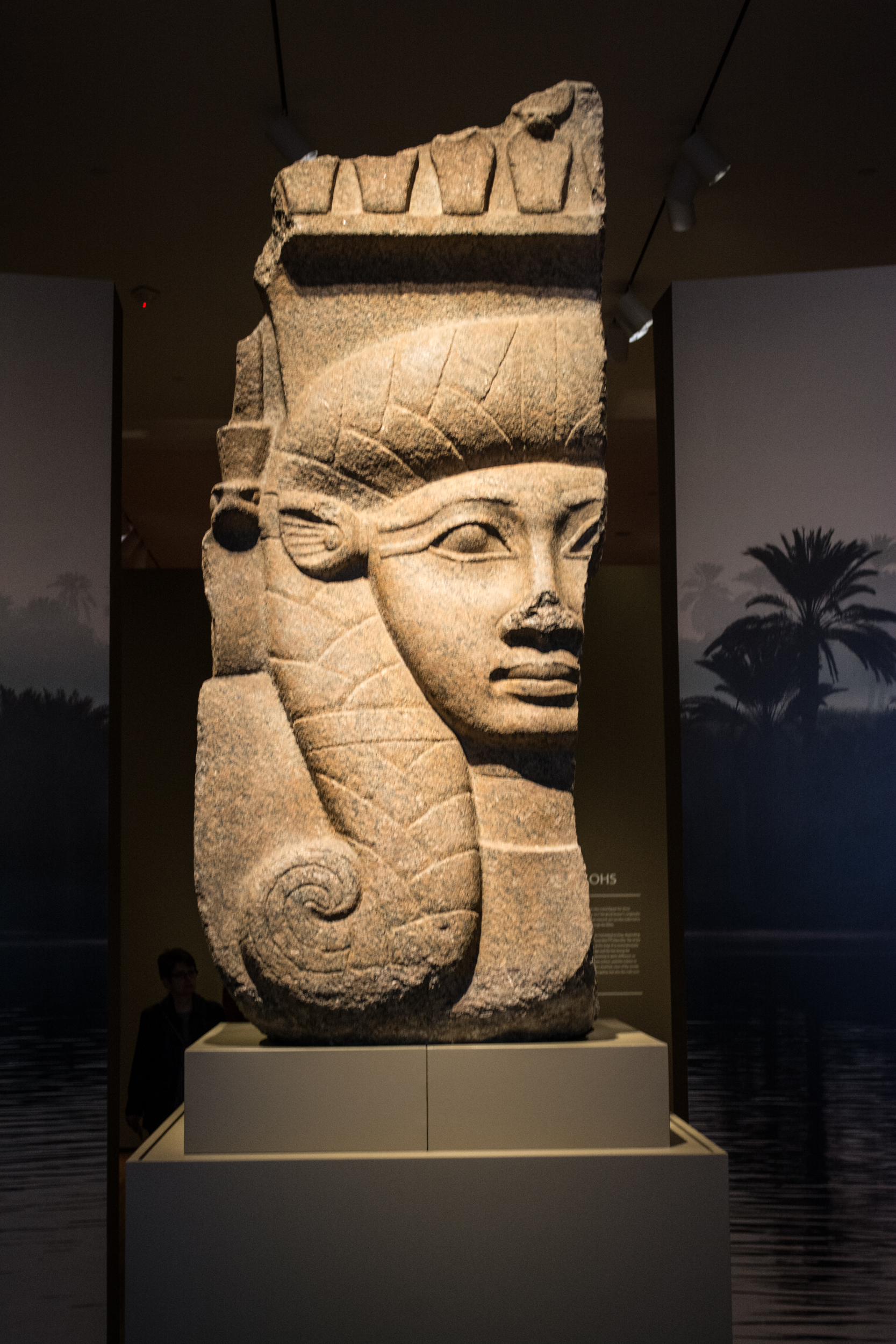
Hathor capital from the Temple of Bubastis in the collection of the British Museum

Bubastis served as the capital of the nome of Am-Khent, the 18th nome of Lower Egypt. Bubastis was situated southwest of Tanis, upon the eastern side of the Pelusiac branch of the Nile.

Situated on the Pelusiac branch of the Nile and near the entrance to the Wadi Tumilat, the city was a vital hub for trade and military expeditions heading toward the Sinai Peninsula and the Levant. The area was a dynamic riverine landscape with constantly changing hydrography. The water canals around the Temple of Bastet were part of the sacred landscape.

=== Early Bronze Age ===
The settlement began at the end of the 4th millennium BCE.

==== Second Dynasty ====
In the 2nd Dynasty, the Cult of Bastet is known from the reign of Hotepsekhemwy (2850 BCE). In a later account by the Greek historian Manetho, it's stated that a "chasm opened near Bubastis and many perished" during the reign of Hotepsekhemwy in the Second Dynasty.

==== Fourth Dynasty ====
During the 4th Dynasty (2670–2500 BCE), the Western Kom remained the centre of the settlement and a governor's palace was built there. The governor's palace seem to have been abandoned during the 5th dynasty.

==== Sixth Dynasty ====
There were two temples for the worship of the royal Ka of the rulers Teti and Pepi I in the 6th Dynasty (2350–2198 BCE).

=== Middle Bronze Age ===
==== Twelfth Dynasty ====
The great Temple of Bastet seen today is largely from later periods, but reused blocks and archaeological strata indicate that Middle Kingdom pharaohs (including Amenemhat I and Senusret III) contributed to or renovated the existing sanctuary.

In the 12th Dynsaty, a large palace for the governors of Bubastis (16,000 sqm) was built on the northern part of the Northern Kom. There was a cemetery to the east of the palace. It has been thought to be a residence of Amenemhat III. A limestone lintel shows the king during his Heb Sed Festival.

==== Second Intermediate Period ====
In the Second Intermediate Period, the transitional phase between the Middle Kingdom (MBA) and New Kingdom (LBA), Bubastis was still active. At Bubastis, a red granite architrave belonged to Sekhemre Khutawy Khabaw. In another monument found at Tanis, he is mentioned along with Hor.

=== Late Bronze Age ===
During the New Kingdom, Bubastis served as the capital of the 18th Lower Egyptian nome (Am-Khent), acting as a vital military and trade gateway between the Nile Delta and the Sinai Peninsula.

- Amenhotep II (18th Dynasty): A red granite relief found at the site depicts him worshipping the god Amun, indicating that the city was a recipient of royal architectural attention.
- Ramesses II (19th Dynasty): "Ramesses the Great" significantly expanded the Temple of Bastet. Much of the red granite used in the temple today bears his cartouches. He also erected colossal statues at the site, including one of his daughter-wife, Queen Meritamun, which remains one of the site's most famous finds.
- Seti I and Seti II: Inscriptions and artifacts, such as a gold cup bearing the name of Queen Tawosret (consort of Seti II), demonstrate continued royal presence and high-status patronage through the end of the 19th Dynasty

=== Iron Age ===
==== Twenty-Second Dynasty ====
It became a royal residence after Shoshenq I, the first ruler and founder of the 22nd Dynasty, became pharaoh in 943 BC. Bubastis was its height during this dynasty and the 23rd. It declined after the conquest by Cambyses II in 525 BC, which heralded the end of the Saite 26th Dynasty and the start of the Achaemenid Empire.

The Twenty Second Dynasty of Egyptian monarchs consisted of nine, or, according to Eusebius of three Bubastite kings, and during their reigns the city was one of the most considerable places in the Delta. Immediately to the south of Bubastis were the allotments of land with which Psamtik I rewarded the services of his Ionian and Carian mercenaries; and on the northern side of the city commenced the Canal of the Pharaohs, which Pharaoh Necho II began (but never finished) to go between the Nile and the Red Sea.

=== Persian rule and decline ===
After Bubastis was taken by the Persians, its walls were dismantled. From this period it gradually declined, although it appears in ecclesiastical annals among the episcopal sees of the province Augustamnica Secunda. Bubastite coins of the age of Hadrian exist. The following is the description which Herodotus gives of Bubastis, as it appeared shortly after the period of the Persian invasion, 525 BC, and Hamilton remarks that the plan of the ruins remarkably warrants the accuracy of this historical eye-witness:

Temples there are more spacious and costlier than that of Bubastis, but none so pleasant to behold. It is after the following fashion. Except at the entrance, it is surrounded by water: for two canals branch off from the river, and run as far as the entrance to the temple: yet neither canal mingles with the other, but one runs on this side, and the other on that. Each canal is a hundred feet wide, and its banks are lined with trees. The propylaea are sixty feet in height, and are adorned with sculptures (probably intaglios in relief) nine feet high, and of excellent workmanship. The Temple being in the middle of the city is looked down upon from all sides as you walk around; and this comes from the city having been raised, whereas the temple itself has not been moved, but remains in its original place. Quite round the temple there goes a wall, adorned with sculptures. Within the inclosure is a grove of fair tall trees, planted around a large building in which is the effigy (of Bast). The form of that temple is square, each side being a stadium in length. In a line with the entrance is a road built of stone about three stadia long, leading eastwards through the public market. The road is about 400 feet (120 m) broad, and is flanked by exceeding tall trees. It leads to the temple of Hermes.

The nome and city of Bubastis were allotted to the Calasirian division of the Egyptian war-caste.

== Christian bishopric ==
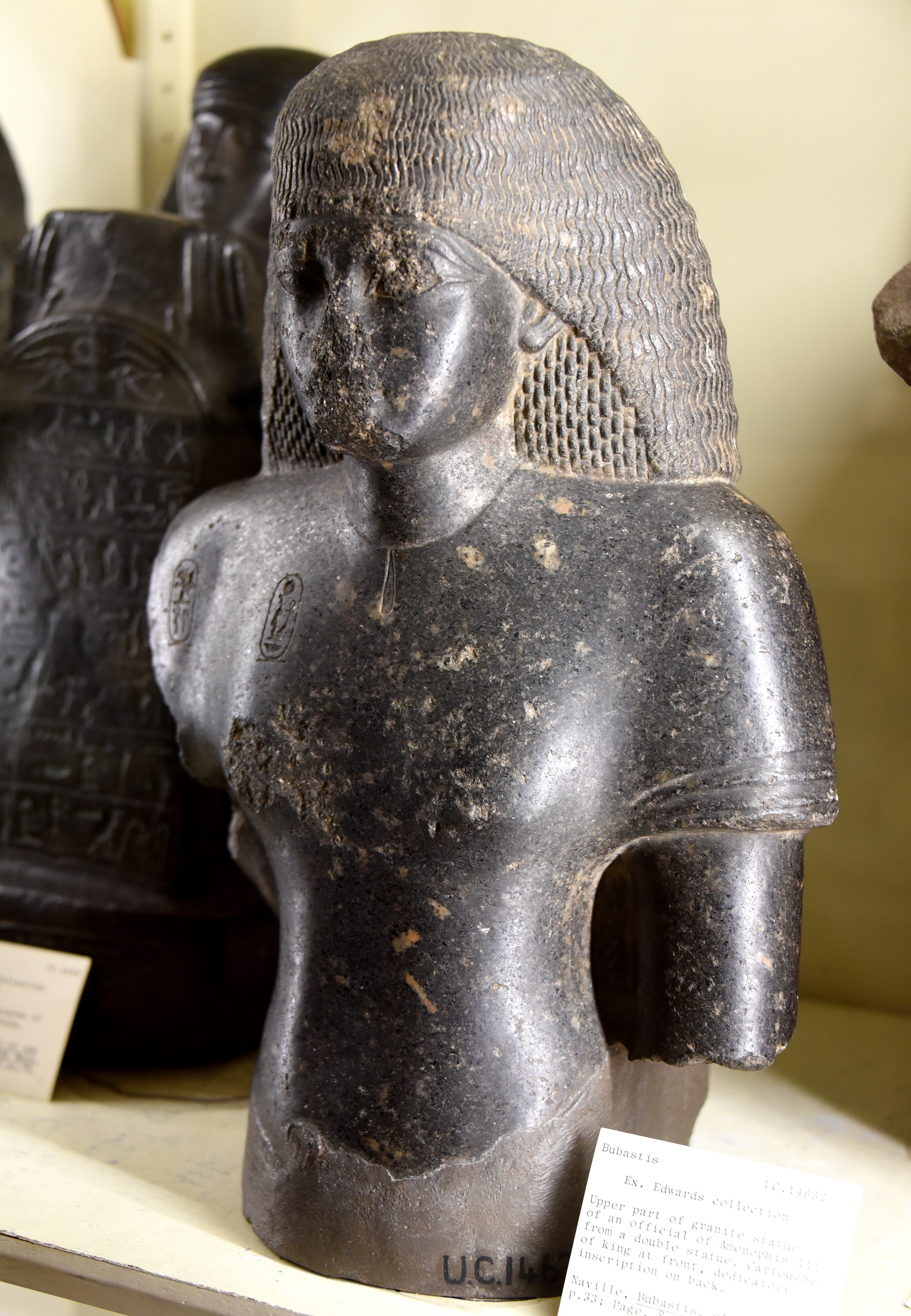
Upper part, figure of an official of Amenhotep III, from a double statue. From Bubastis, Egypt. Petrie Museum of Egyptian Archaeology, London

Extant documents mention the names of three Christian bishops of Bubastis of the 4th and 5th centuries:

- Harpocration, one of the bishops ordained by Melitius of Lycopolis listed in 325
- Hermon, a contemporary of Athanasius of Alexandria, in about 362
- Iulianus at the Second Council of Ephesus in 449

== Excavations ==
The tomb of the late New Kingdom vizier Iuty was discovered in December 1964 in the "Cemetery of the Nobles" of Bubastis by the Egyptian archaeologist Shafik Farid.

Since 2008, the German-Egyptian "Tell Basta Project" has been conducting excavations at Bubastis. Previously, in March 2004, a well preserved copy of the Decree of Canopus was discovered in the city.

== See also ==
- List of ancient Egyptian towns and cities

Preceded by Tanis	Capital of Egypt; 945 - 715 BC	Succeeded by Leontopolis
