= Twenty-sixth Dynasty of Egypt family tree =

Family tree of ancient Egyptian rulers

The family tree of the 26th Dynasty is just as complex and unclear as earlier dynasties. This dynasty possibly traced its origins to the Saite 24th Dynasty, and scholars now start the dynasty with the reign of Psamtik I, sometimes referrings to the previous rulers – Ammeris to Necho I – as "proto-Saites". The rule of the family of Necho I and Psamtik I ends with the death of Apries, who was replaced by Amasis II, originally a general, and not of the royal house at all. Amasis and his son Psamtik III are the final rulers of the 26th Dynasty.

(24th Dynasty)
Ammeris
Tefnakht II
Nekauba	Necho I	Istemabet
Mehytenweskhet	Psamtik I	Takheredentaihetweret?
Nitocris I	Necho II	Khedebneithirbinet I?
Takhuit	Psamtik II	Tjenmuteti
Ankhnesneferibre	Apries	Tashereniset B
Tadiasir?	Tentkheta	Amasis II	Nakhtubasterau
Psamtik III	Nitocris II	Ahmose D	Pasenenkhonsu
