= Twenty-sixth Dynasty of Egypt =

Ancient Egyptian dynasty (664–525 BC)

- 664 BC–525 BC
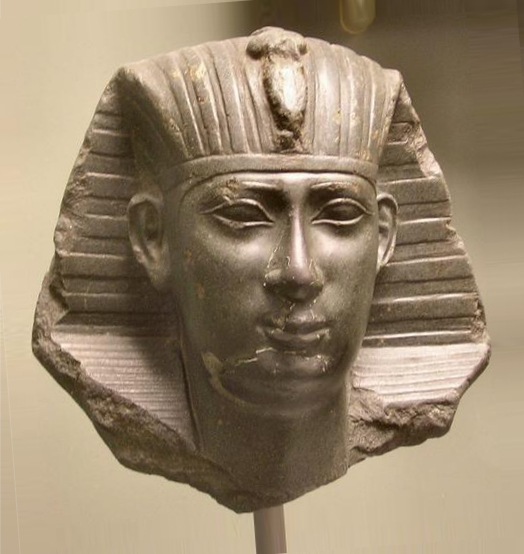
- Portrait of a Pharaoh of the Saite Dynasty
- Capital: Sais
- Common languages: Egyptian language
- Religion: Ancient Egyptian religion
- Government: Monarchy
- Pharaoh
  - 664–610 BC: Psamtik I (first)
  - 526–525 BC: Psamtik III (last)
- History
  - Established: 664 BC
  - Disestablished: 525 BC
Preceded by
Assyrian conquest of Egypt
Third Intermediate Period of Egypt
Twenty-fifth Dynasty of Egypt
Succeeded by
Twenty-seventh Dynasty of Egypt

The Twenty-sixth Dynasty of Egypt (notated Dynasty XXVI, alternatively 26th Dynasty or Dynasty 26) was the last native dynasty of ancient Egypt before the Persian conquest in 525 BC (although other brief periods of rule by Egyptians followed). The dynasty's reign (664–525 BC) is also called the Saite Period after the city of Sais, where its pharaohs had their capital, and marks the beginning of the Late Period of ancient Egypt.

== History ==
This dynasty traced its origins to the Twenty-fourth Dynasty. Psamtik I was probably a descendant of Bakenranef. However, other sources describe him as of Libyan descent.

Following the Neo-Assyrian conquest of Egypt during the reigns of Taharqa and Tantamani, and the subsequent collapse of the Napata-based Twenty-fifth Dynasty of Egypt, Psamtik I was recognized as sole king over all of Egypt. Psamtik formed alliances with King Gyges of Lydia, who sent him mercenaries from Caria and ancient Greece that Psamtik used to unify all of Egypt under his rule.

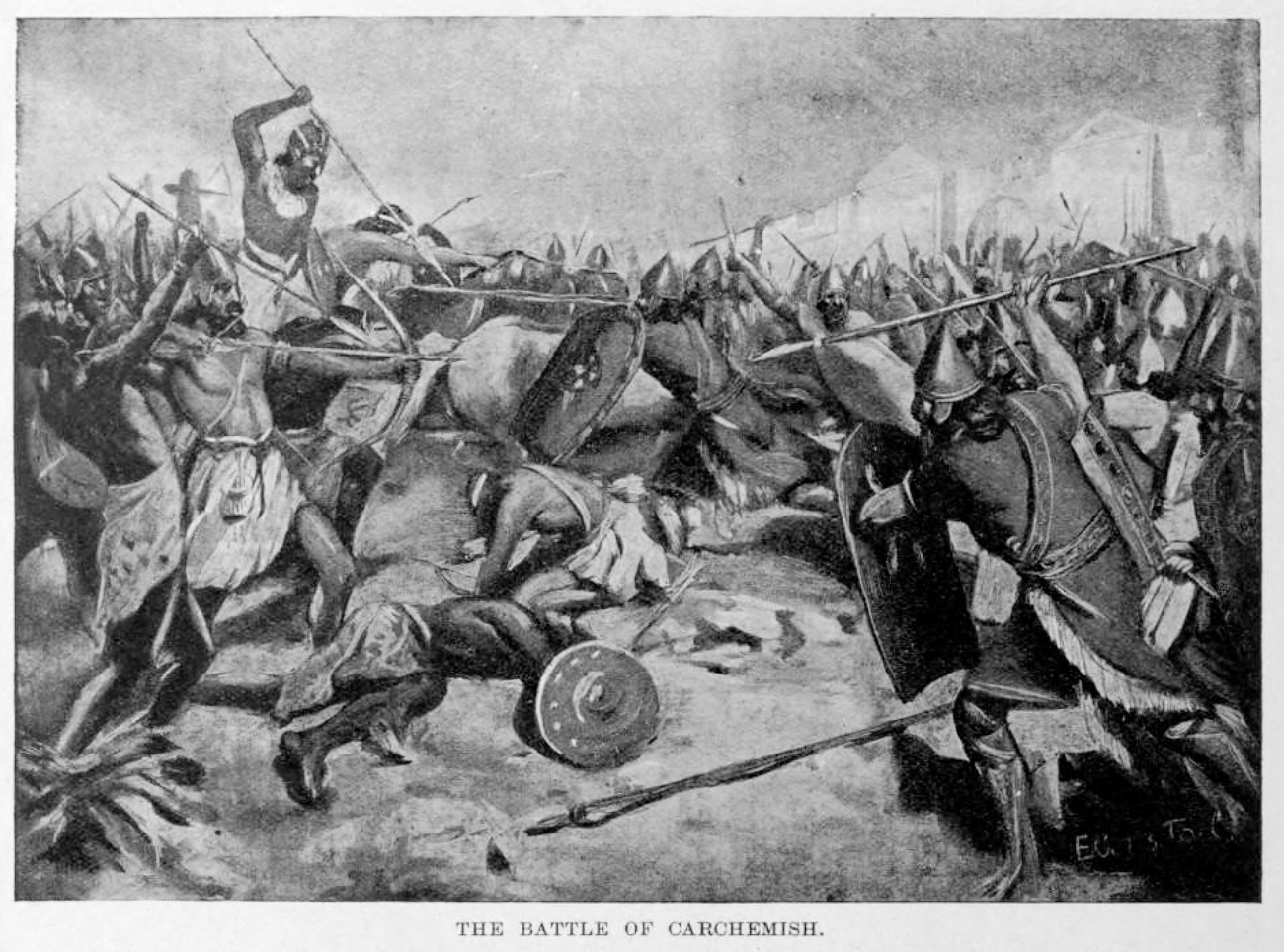
In 605 BCE, an Egyptian force under Necho II of Dynasty XXVI fought the Neo-Babylonian Empire at the Battle of Carchemish, helped by the remnants of the military of the Neo-Assyrian Empire, but this was met with defeat. Illustration published in 1915.

With the sack of Nineveh in 612 BC and the Fall of the Neo-Assyrian Empire, both Psamtik and his successors attempted to reassert Egyptian power in the Near East but were driven back by the Neo-Babylonian Empire under Nebuchadnezzar II. With the help of Greek mercenaries, Pharaoh Apries was able to hold back Babylonian attempts to conquer Egypt, although Apries was later deposed by Amasis II in 570 BC, who became the next Pharaoh of Egypt.

In Amasis' fourth year, around 568–567 BC, Egypt was invaded by the Babylonians, under the leadership of Nebuchadnezzar II. This assault was recorded by a fragmentary Babylonian inscription, with the modern designation BM 33041; the inscription from that year records the word "Egypt" as well as possible traces of the name "Amasis". A stele of Amasis from the 4th year of his reign in 567 BC, also fragmentary, may also describe a combined naval and land attack by the Babylonians. Recent evidence suggests that the Babylonians were initially successful during the invasion and gained a foothold in Egypt, but they were repelled by Amasis' forces. It is believed that this forced Nebuchadnezzar II to retire plans to conquer Egypt. (However, some have suggested that Nebuchadnezzar came to defeat Apries, with the combined forces of Amasis and Nebuchadnezzar managing to kill him, securing Amasis' throne, though as vassal king.)

The Persians would eventually invade Egypt in 525 BCE when Emperor Cambyses II captured and later executed Psamtik III in the First Achaemenid conquest of Egypt, marking the end of the last native dynasty of Egypt. Cambyses founded the First Egyptian Satrapy, a territory of the Achaemenid Empire, and was crowned the first Pharaoh of the Dynasty XXVII.

=== Archaeology ===
In May 2020, an Egyptian-Spanish archaeological mission headed by Esther Ponce revealed a unique cemetery, which consists of one room built with glazed limestone dating back to the 26th Dynasty (also known as the El-Sawi era) at the site of ancient Oxyrhynchus. Archaeologists also uncovered bronze coins, clay seals, Roman tombstones and small crosses. On October 3, 2020, Egypt unveiled 59 coffins of priests and clerks from the 26th dynasty, dating to nearly 2,500 years ago.

== Art ==
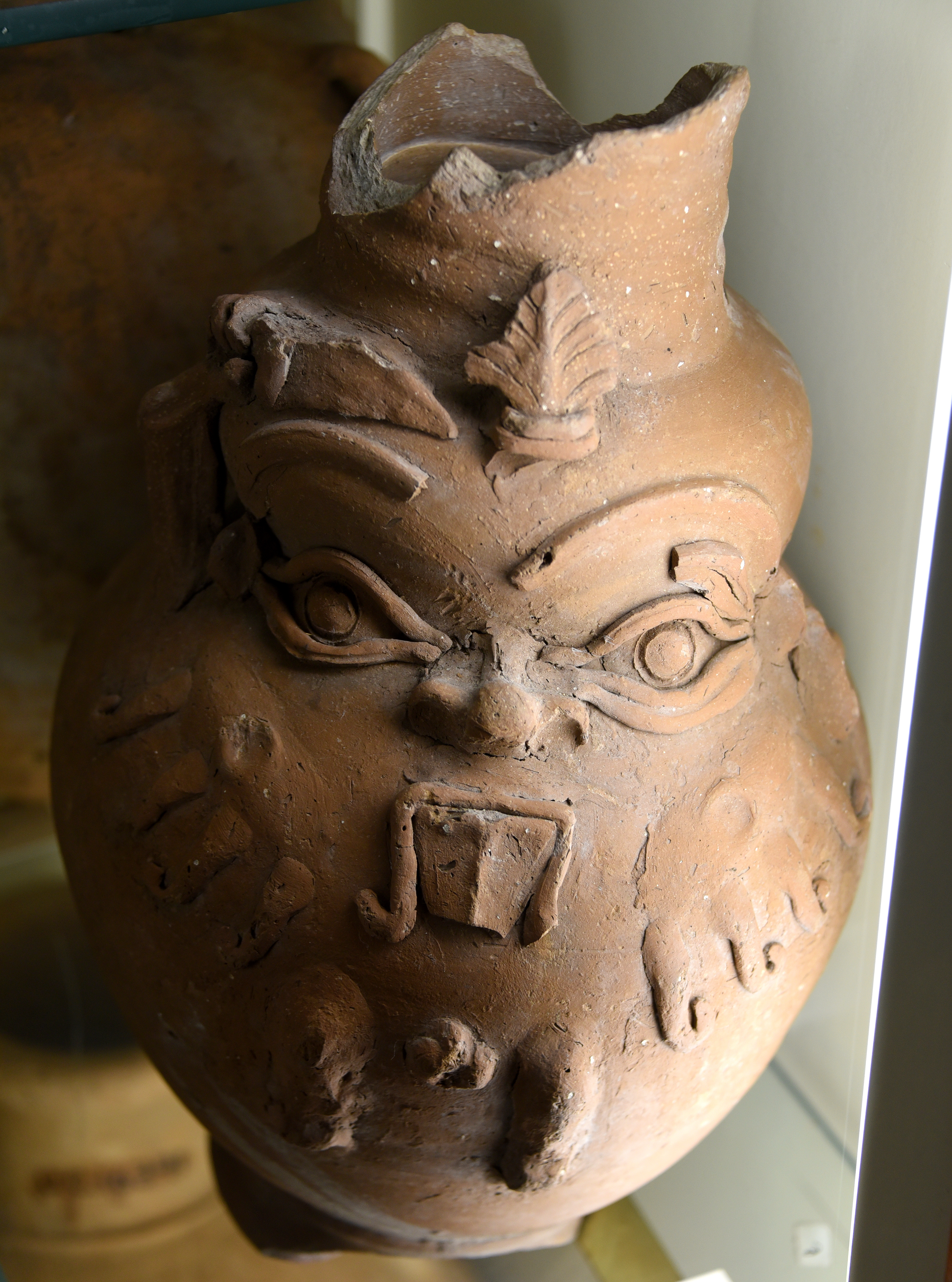
Pottery vessel showing the face of god Bes from the 26th Dynasty. Petrie Museum of Egyptian Archaeology, London

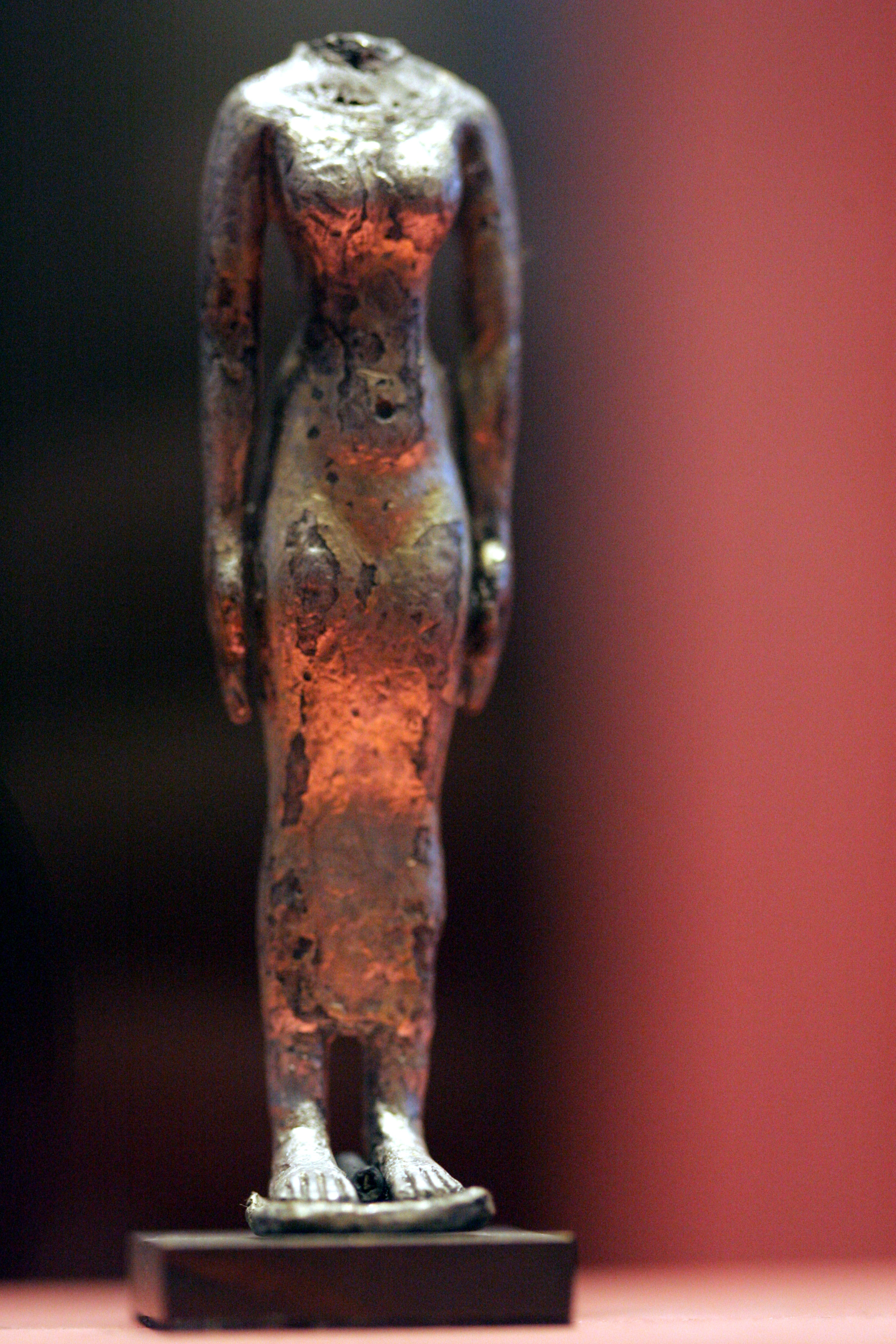
Female figure, Louvre Museum. The name of Psamtik I is inscribed under the feet.

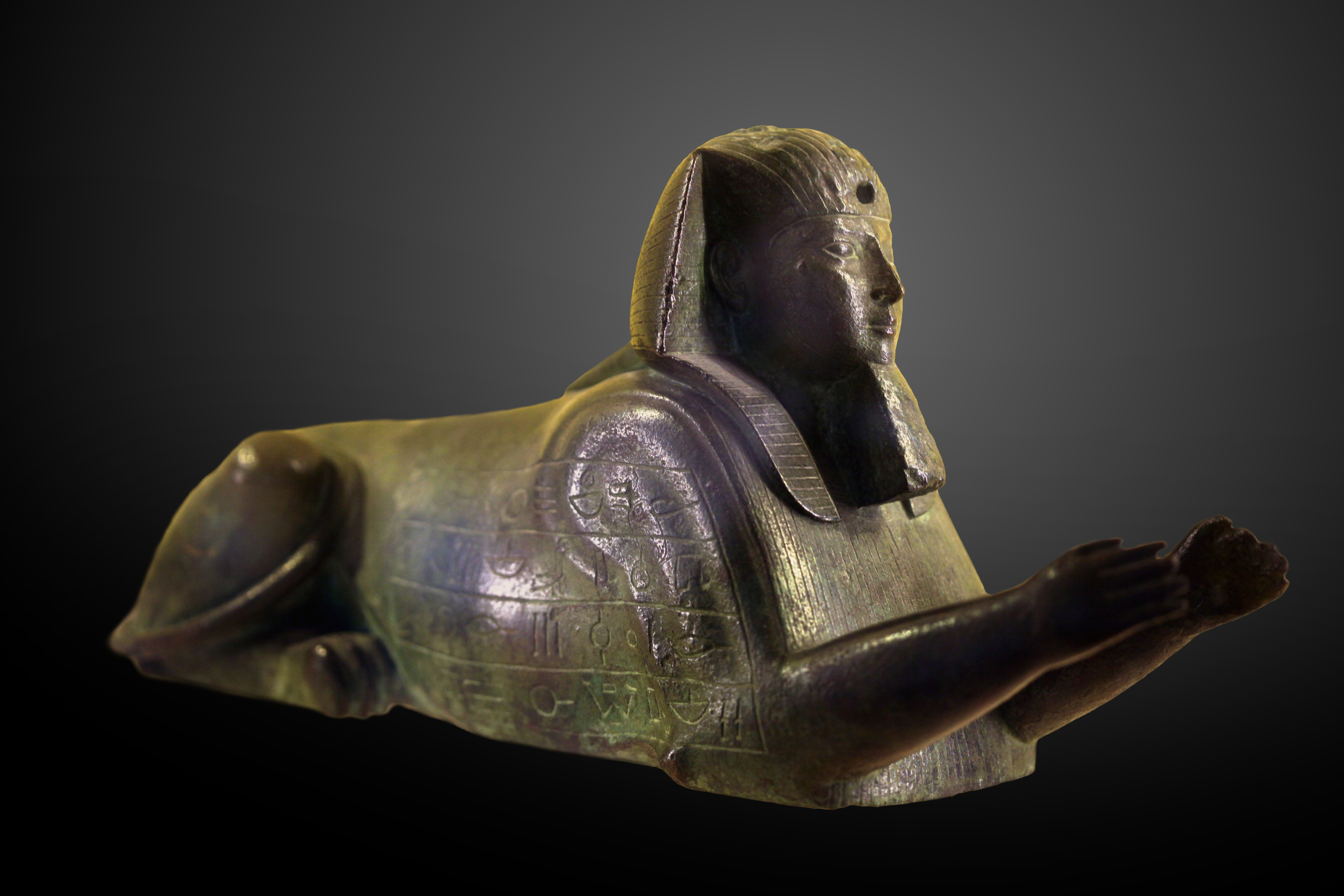
Sphinx of Apries, from the collection of Anne Claude de Caylus

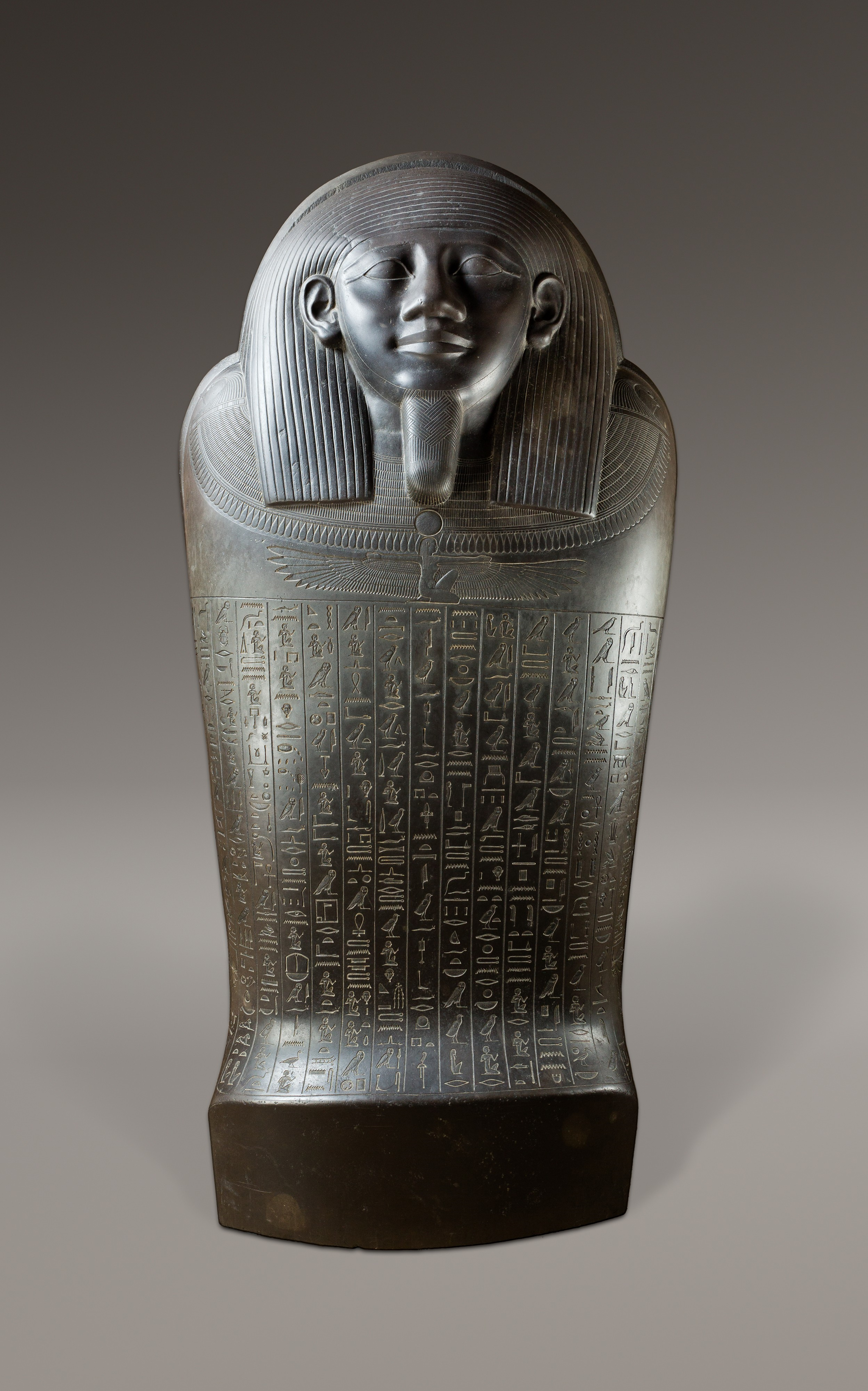
Sarcophagus of Harkhebit "Royal Seal Bearer, Sole Companion, Chief Priest of the Shrines of Upper and Lower Egypt, and Overseer of the Cabinet", 595–526 BCE, Saqqara, 26th dynasty of Egypt.

== Pharaohs of the 26th Dynasty ==
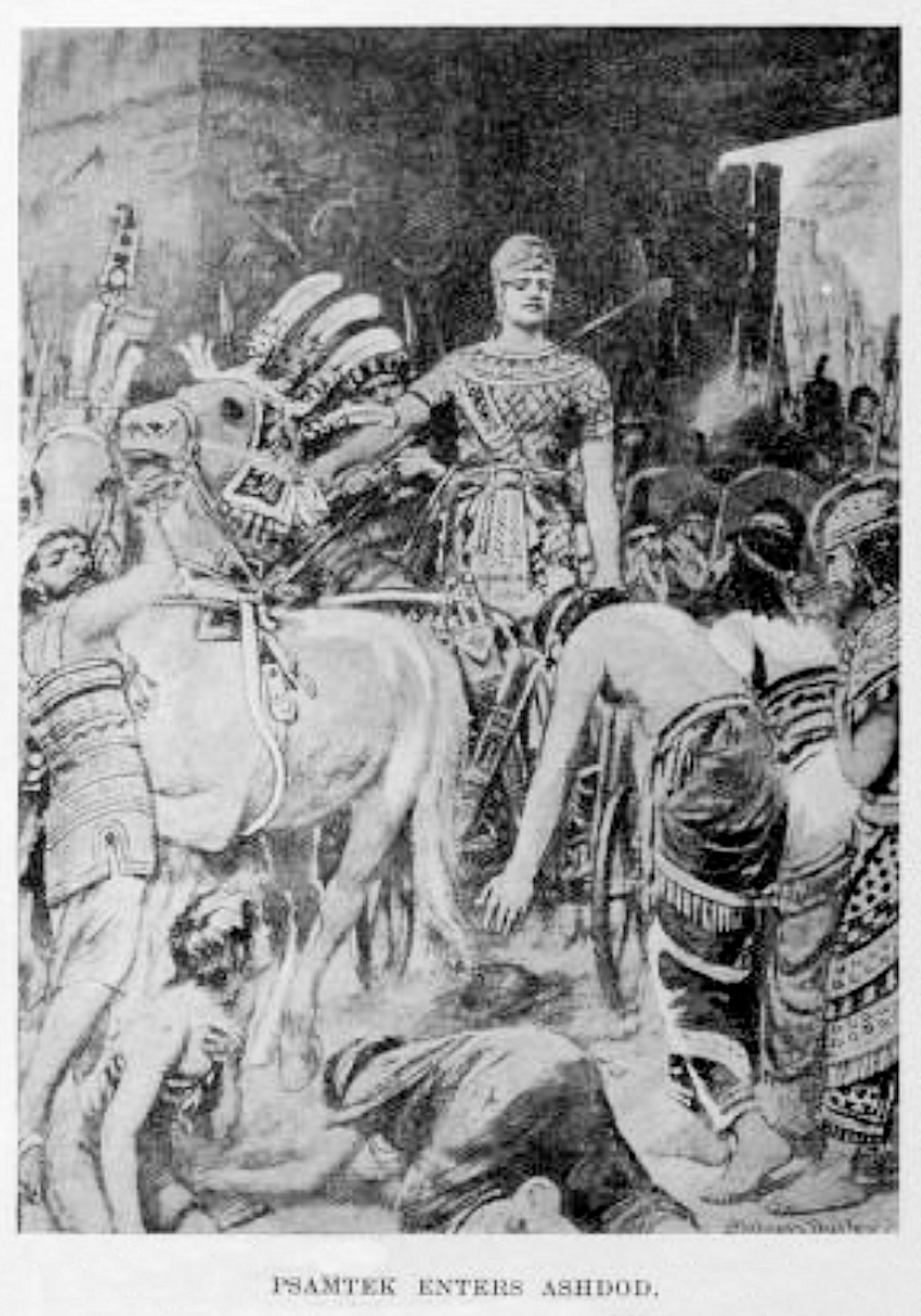
Psamtik I enters Ashdod, in the Fall of Ashdod in 635 BCE.

The 26th Dynasty may be related to the 24th Dynasty. Manetho begins the dynasty with:

- Ammeris the Nubian (= ? Ammeris), 12 (or 18) years
- Stephinates (= ? Tefnakht II), 7 years
- Nechepsos (= ? Nekauba), 6 years
- Necho (= ? Necho I), 8 years.

When the Nubian King Shabaka defeated Bakenranef, son of Tefnakht, he likely installed a Nubian commander as governor at Sais. This may be the man named Ammeris. Stephinates may be a descendant of Bakenrenef. He is sometimes referred to as Tefnakht II in the literature. Nechepsos has been identified with a local king named Nekauba (678–672 BC). Manetho's Necho is King Necho I (672–664 BC); Manetho gives his reign as 8 years. Necho was killed during a conflict with the Nubian king Tantamani. Psamtik I fled to Nineveh – capital of the Neo-Assyrian Empire – and returned to Egypt when Ashurbanipal defeated Tantamani and drove him back south. Scholars now start the 26th Dynasty with the reign of Psamtik I.

Sextus Julius Africanus states in his often accurate version of Manetho's Epitome that the dynasty numbered nine pharaohs, beginning with a "Stephinates" (Tefnakht II) and ending with Psamtik III. Africanus also notes that Psamtik I and Necho I ruled for 54 and 8 years respectively.

Dynasty XXVI Kings of Egypt
Pharaoh	Image	Prenomen (Throne name)	Horus-name	Reign	Burial	Consort(s)	Comments
Psamtik I Psammetichus I		Wahibre	Aaib	664–610 BC	Sais	Mehytenweskhet	Reunified Egypt and ended the Kushite control of Upper Egypt. Manetho gives his reign as 54 years.
Necho II		Wehemibre	Siaib	610–595 BC		Khedebneithirbinet I	Necho II is the Pharaoh most likely mentioned in several books of the Bible.
Psamtik II; Psammetichus II	Statue of Psamtitk II. Louvre Museum	Neferibre	Menekhib	595–589 BC		Takhuit	
Wahibre Haaibre; Apries)		Haaibre		589–570 BC		Wahib	Overthrown and forced into exile by Amasis II. Returned to Egypt at the head of a Babylonian army, but was defeated and likely killed. Manetho gives his reign as 19 years.
Amasis II; Ahmose II		Khenem-ib-re	Semenmaat	570–526 BC	Sais	Tentkheta; Nakhtubasterau	Herodotus claims that when Cambyses II invaded Egypt, realizing he was not able to exact revenge for Amasis's previous misdeeds and trickery, he exhumed his body, desecrated it and burned what remained of the mummy.
Psamtik III; Psammetichus III		Ankhkaenre	(unknown)	526–525 BC			Ruled for only 6 months, according to Herodotus, before a Persian invasion led by Cambyses II conquered Egypt and captured Psamtik III. Committed suicide in Persian captivity.

== See also ==
- History of ancient Egypt
- Twenty-sixth Dynasty of Egypt family tree
- Late Period of ancient Egypt
- Saite Oracle Papyrus

== Bibliography ==
- Hussein Bassir, (editor: Pearce Paul Creasman), Image and Voice in Saite Egypt: Self Presentations of Neshor Named Psamtikmenkhib and Payeftjauemawyneith University of Arizona Egyptian Expedition, Wilkinson Egyptology Series, 288 pages, Volume 2 2014 PDF
- Aidan Dodson, Dyan Hilton. The Complete Royal Families of Ancient Egypt. The American University in Cairo Press, London, 2004.
- Kenneth Kitchen, The Third Intermediate Period in Egypt, 1100–650 B.C. (Book & Supplement) Aris & Phillips. 1986 ISBN 978-0-85668-298-8.
- Karl Jansen-Winkeln, Bild und Charakter der ägyptischen 26. Dynastie, Altorientalische Forschungen, 28 (2001), 165–182.

Preceded by Assyrian conquest of Egypt	Dynasties of Egypt c. 664 BC–525 BC	Succeeded by Twenty-seventh Dynasty
