= Ammeris =

Egyptian ruler

Ammeris the Nubian
- Governor of Sais
- Tenure: c. 715/713 – c. 695 BCE
- Predecessor: Bakenranef (not directly)
- Successor: Stephinates
- Dynasty: "Proto-Saite Dynasty"
- Died: c. 695 BCE

Ammeris (Ancient Greek: Ἀμμέρις Amméris) was a governor of Sais attributed to the so-called "Proto-Saite Dynasty" of ancient Egypt.

== Biography ==
His name is only attested on Eusebius' epitome of Manetho's Aegyptiaca. Eusebius gave him 12 or 18 years depending on the versions, and calls him Ammeris (or Ameres) "the Nubian", placing him as the first king of the 26th Dynasty.

A reconstructed account of events is as follows: when, around 720 – 716 BCE (or 715 – 712 BCE, since dates are disputed) Shebitqo of the 25th Dynasty defeated Bakenranef of the 24th Dynasty, the former chose a faithful commander and placed him to the government of Sais. The original name of this ruler is lost, but it was evidently hellenized to Ammeris or Ameres, with the nickname "the Nubian" on account of his place of origin. He probably ruled the city until c. 695 BCE, when he was succeeded by Stephinates (Tefnakht II).

== Bibliography ==
- Kenneth Kitchen, The Third Intermediate Period in Egypt (1100–650 BC), 1996, Aris & Phillips Limited, Warminster, ISBN 0-85668-298-5.
