= Tefnakht II =

Ancient Egyptian ruler

- Stephinates
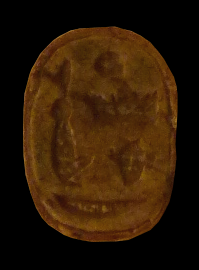
- A scarab attributed to a king Menibre who, according to Kitchen, may have been Tefnakht II. Bologna, Museo Civico Archeologico, KS 2670.

King of Sais
- Reign: 695 – 688 BC
- Predecessor: Ammeris? (as governor of Sais)
- Successor: Nekauba
Royal titulary
Prenomen
Menibre or Iribre(?)
Nomen
Tefnakht
- Children: Nekauba, Necho I
- Dynasty: Proto-Saite Dynasty

Tefnakht II (Ancient Greek: Στεφινάτης Stephinátēs, Στεφινάθις Stephináthis; Latin: Stephinates, Stephinathis) was an ancient Egyptian ruler of the city of Sais during the early 7th century BC. He is recognized as an early member of the so-called "Proto-Saite Dynasty", which directly preceded the 26th Dynasty of Egypt.

== Biography ==
Tefnakht II is mainly known by Manetho's Aegyptiaca, under the name Stephinates. Based on Manetho's work, Sextus Julius Africanus called Stephinates the founder of the 26th Dynasty while another historian, Eusebius, placed a certain Ammeris "the Nubian" just before him. In both cases, the two historians credited Stephinates with a 7-year-long reign.

In 1917, Flinders Petrie was the first to argue that "Stephinates" was probably an Ancient Greek render of the Egyptian name Tefnakht, and first called this ruler "Tefnakht II" in order to distinguish him by the namesake Great Chief of the West who few decades earlier clashed against pharaoh Piye of the Kushite 25th Dynasty and later rose to kingship under the name Shepsesre Tefnakht (I), founding the short-lived Saite 24th Dynasty.

Kenneth Kitchen hypothesized that Tefnakht II may have been a relative of pharaoh Bakenranef – son and successor of Tefnakht I – who was probably killed by Shebitqo and then replaced by a faithful governor, the aforementioned Ammeris. Thus, according to Kitchen, Tefnakht II effectively restored a Saite dynasty, and ruled from 695 to 688 BC. He was then succeeded by another relative called Nekhepsos in Greek, and identified with the Egyptian Nekauba. It is possible that many scarabs datable to this period, and bearing the otherwise unknown throne names Menibre and Iribre, belongs indeed to Tefnakht II and Nekauba.

In 2011, Kim Ryholt made a case for Tefnakht II being the father of the later pharaoh Necho I: according to a papyrus from Tebtunis, the latter was the son of a king named Tefnakht, with the most likely choice being Tefnakht II.

== Tefnakht I and Tefnakht II ==
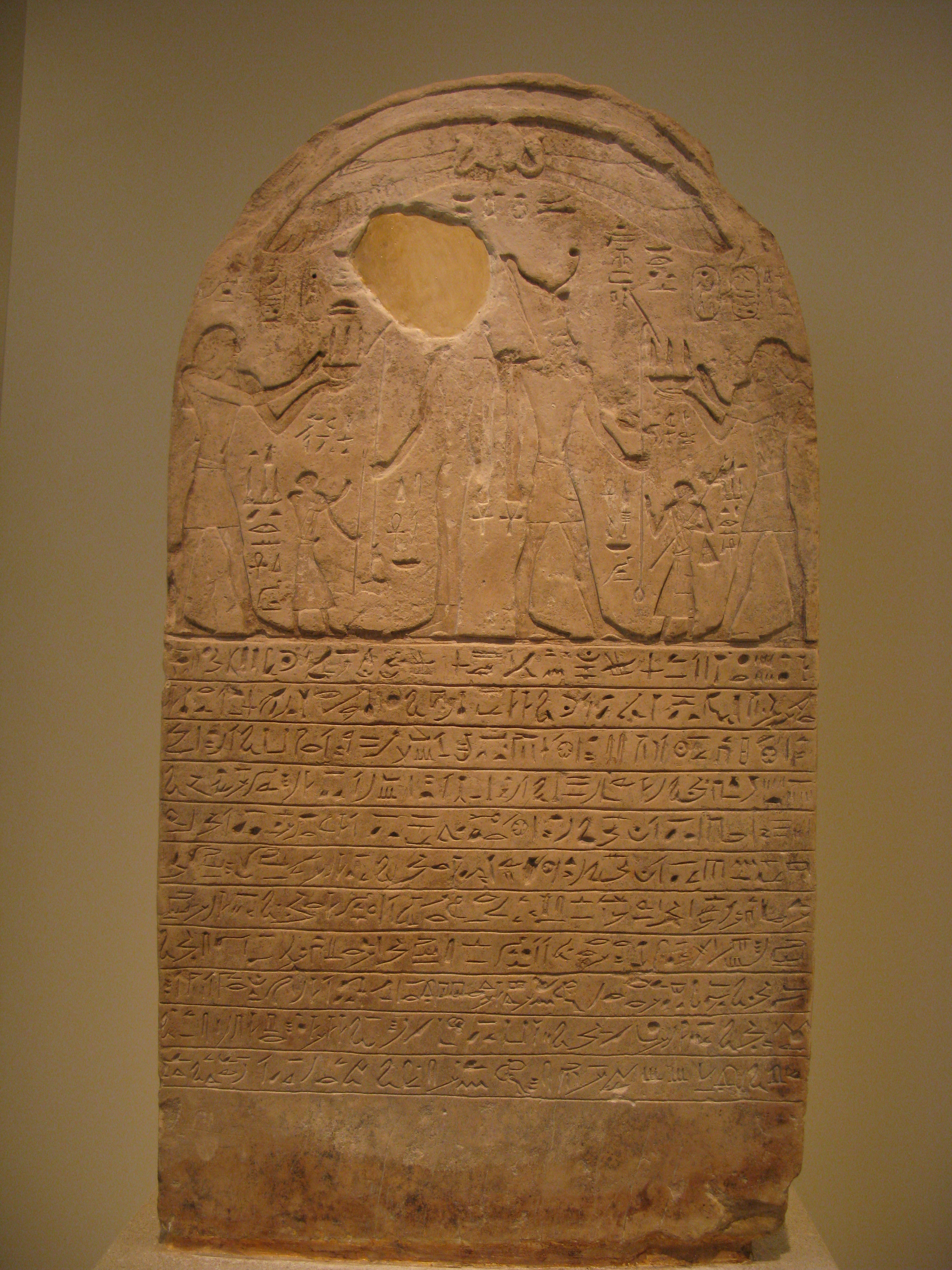
Year 8 stela of king Shepsesre Tefnakht. Oliver Perdu suggested to identify him with Tefnakht II rather than Tefnakht I

Since the initial claim by Petrie, there were scholars whom questioned the distinction between Tefnakht I and Tefnakht II. In 1956, Wolfgang Helck equated the two figures, a position later rejected by Karl-Heinz Priese, who stated that there was no compelling reason to identify Tefnakht II with Tefnakht I aside from the similarity of their names.
In more recent times, Oliver Perdu noticed close similarities in style, form and content between a newly discovered donation stela dating to Year 2 of Necho I, and a Year 8 donation stela of Shepsesre Tefnakht (I). Perdu argued that these two Saite rulers were more close contemporaries than usually believed, and suggested that Shepsesre Tefnakht is in fact Tefnakht II and not Tefnakht I, the former having lived just few years before Necho I while the latter, several decades before.
Perdu's arguments were put in discussion by Dan'el Kahn who note that his epigraphic criteria here – such as the use of the tripartite wig, the slender figure of the king and the method through which the falcon-headed god keeps his head upright in stelas and temple wall reliefs contemporary with Tefnakht I's time – appear in use already in the early 25th Dynasty during Piye's or Shabaka's reign and even in Shoshenq V's Year 38 donation stela of the Chief of the Ma Tefnakht (I), who was Piye's rival.

Preceded by Ammeris (as governor of Sais)	Pharaoh of Egypt; Proto-Saite Dynasty	Succeeded by Nekauba
