= Tefnakht =

Egyptian pharaoh

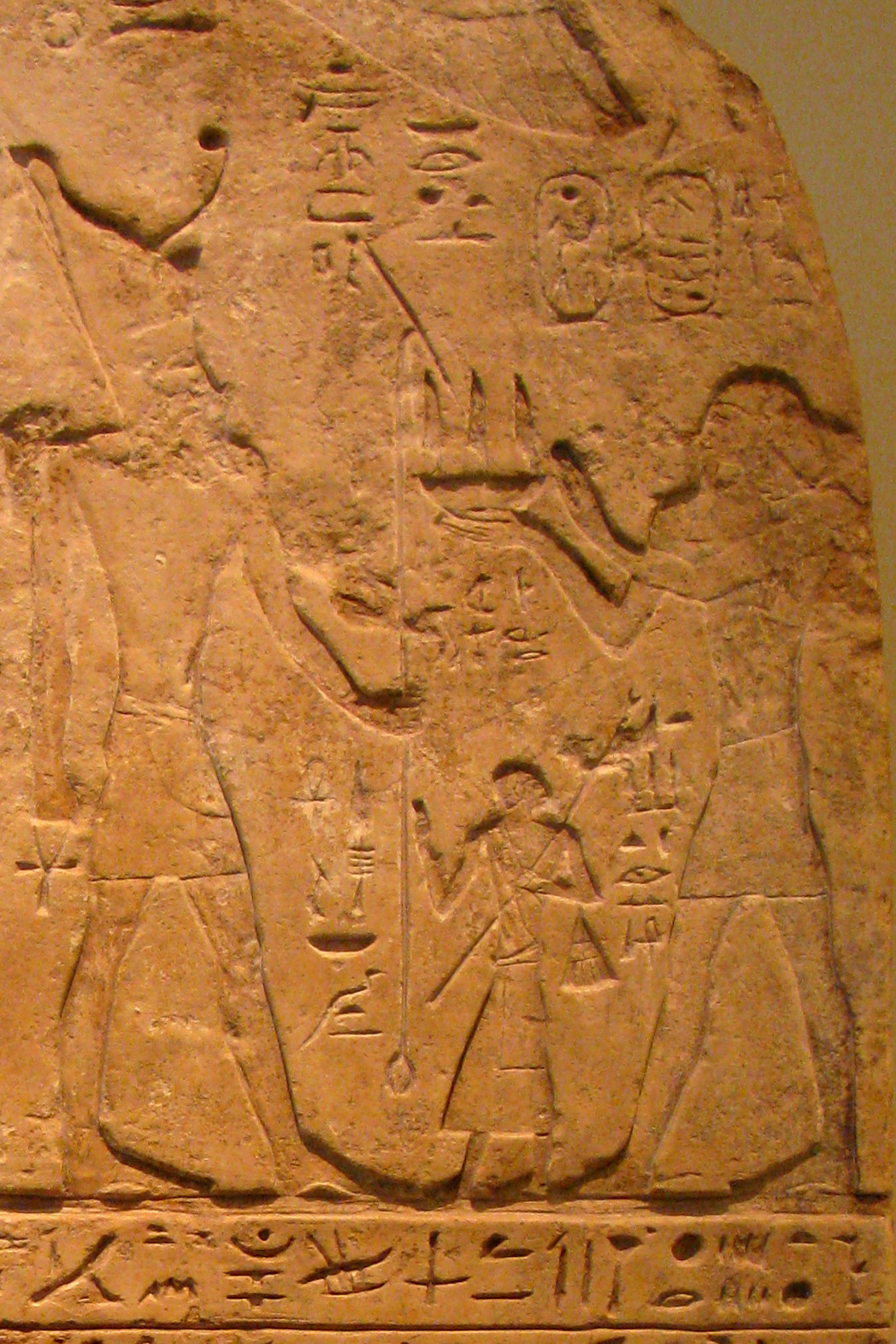
- Tefnakht on his year 8 stela

Pharaoh
- Reign: c.727/726–718 BC
- Predecessor: Osorkon C (Great Chief of the Ma); Ankhhor (Great Chief of the West)
- Successor: Bakenranef
Royal titulary
Horus name
Siakhet[hor]
Sj3-ẖt
Son of Khet
G5	S32 mi
Nebty name
Siakhetnebty
Sj3-ẖt
Son of the Two Ladies' body
G16	S32 F51
Prenomen
Shepsesre
Špss-Rˁ
Noble like Ra

M23 X1 L2 X1	N5 A50 S29 S29
Nomen
Tefnakht
T3y-[.f]-nḫt

G39 N5	X1 G1 I9 N35 M3 Aa1 X1
- Children: Bakenranef
- Father: Gemnefsutkapu
- Dynasty: 24th Dynasty

Shepsesre Tefnakht (in Ancient Greek: Τνέφαχθος, romanized: Tnephachthos) was a prince of Sais and founder of the relatively short Twenty-fourth Dynasty of Egypt; he rose to become a Chief of the Ma in his home city. He is thought to have reigned roughly 726 BCE to 718 BCE, or seven years. Tefnakht I first began his career as the "Great Chief of the West" and Prince of Sais and was a late contemporary of the last ruler of the 22nd Dynasty: Shoshenq V. Tefnakht I was actually the second ruler of Sais; he was preceded by Osorkon C, who is attested by several documents mentioning him as this city's Chief of the Ma and Army Leader, according to Kenneth Kitchen, while his predecessor as Great Chief of the West was a man named Ankhhor. A recently discovered statue, dedicated by Tefnakht I to Amun-Re, reveals important details about his personal origins. The statue's text states that Tefnakht was the son of a certain Gemnefsutkapu and the grandson of Basa, a priest of Amun near Sais. Consequently, Tefnakht was not actually descended from either lines of Chiefs of the Ma and of the Libu as traditionally believed but rather came from a family of priests, and his ancestors being more likely Egyptians rather than Libyans.

Tefnakht is absent from the Manethonian tradition, perhaps because of the abbreviated form in which the Aegyptiaca is known, perhaps because Tefnakht was considered a usurper.

== Biography ==
Tefnakht erected two donation stelas in Years 36 and 38 of Shoshenq V as a Prince at Saïs. His Year 38 stela from Buto is significant not only because Tefnakht employs the rather boastful epithet of "Great Chief of the entire land" but due to its list of his religious titles as prophet of Neith, Edjo and the Lady of Imay. This reflects his control over Sais, Buto to the north and Kom el-Hish to the southwest even prior to the end of the 22nd Dynasty—with the death of Shoshenq V—and reflects Tefnakht's political base in the Western Delta region of Egypt. The 22nd Dynasty was politically fragmenting even prior to the death of Shoshenq V. Tefnakht established his capital at Sais, and formed an alliance with other minor kings of the Delta region in order to conquer Middle and Upper Egypt, which was under the sway of the Nubian king Piye. He was able to capture and unify many of the cities of the Delta region, thus making Tefnakht considerably more powerful than any of his predecessors in either the 22nd or 23rd dynasties.

Tefnakht was not a member of the Tanite-based 22nd Dynasty of Egypt since Tanis is located in the Eastern Delta whereas his local city of Sais was situated in the Western Delta closer to Libya. His modest title 'Great chief of the West' also hints at a non-royal background. Prior to assuming the title of "Great Chief of the West", Tefnakht managed to extend his control southward, capturing the city of Memphis and besieging the city of Herakleopolis, which was an ally of the Kushite king Piye of Nubia. This caused him to face considerable opposition from Piye, especially after Nimlot, the local ruler of Hermopolis defected from Piye's sphere of influence, to his side. A pair of naval engagements soon checked any further advances by Tefnakht's coalition into Piye's Middle Egyptian territories, and Memphis was soon recaptured by Piye. After further campaigns, Tefnakht's allies surrendered to Piye and Tefnakht soon found himself isolated. He finally dispatched a letter formally submitting his loyalty and swearing his loyalty to Piye. Tefnakht, however, was the only Lower Egyptian prince to avoid seeing Piye face to face. These details are recounted in the Great Victory stela of Piye which this Nubian ruler erected on the New Year's Day of his 21st regnal year. Shortly afterwards, Piye returned home to Nubia at Gebel Barkal, and never returned to Lower Egypt again.

== Kingship ==
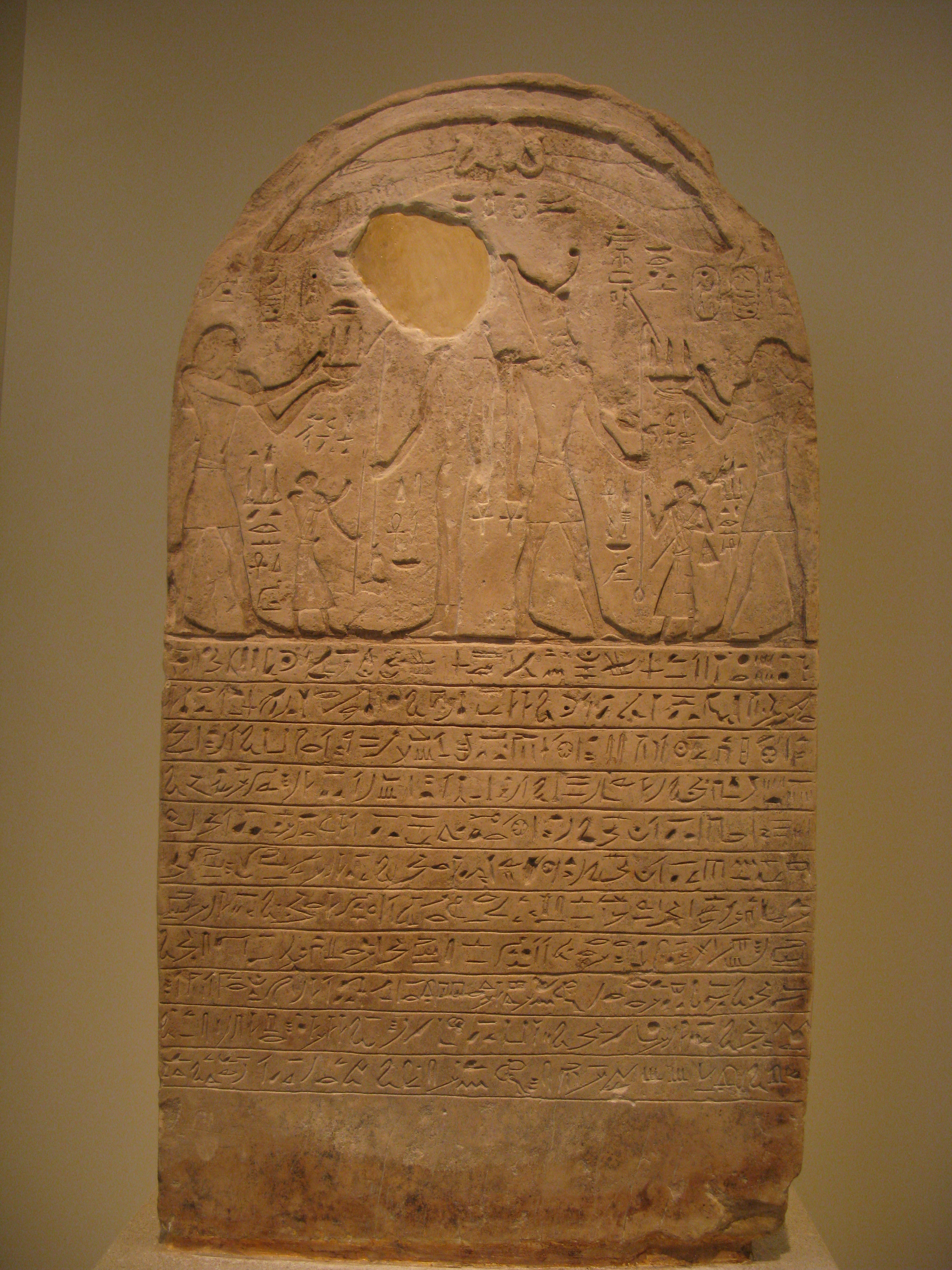
Complete stele of Tefnakht

Despite this setback, Tefnakht was left alone as the local prince of his local region of Sais. He managed, over time, to soon reestablish his kingdom's control in the Delta region from the political vacuum which resulted after Piye's departure from this region. It is generally believed that prince Tefnakht officially proclaimed himself as king Shepsesre Tefnakht I and adopted a royal title sometime after Piye's departure from Lower Egypt. His successor at Sais was Bakenranef.

While most scholars such as Kenneth Kitchen have equated Manetho's Tefnakht with the king Shepsesre Tefnakht of Sais who is attested by the Year 8 Athens donation stela, a recent article by Olivier Perdu has suggested that this Tefnakht was rather Tefnakht II, a much later king of Sais who ruled in the mid-680's BCE during the late Nubian 25th Dynasty. In his paper, Perdu published a newly discovered stela dating from the second year of Necho I's reign, which he contends is similar in style, text and content to the Year 8 stela of Shepsesre Tefnakht. Perdu, thus, infers that these two kings of Sais—Necho I and Tefnakht II—were close contemporaries. However, his arguments are not currently accepted by most Egyptian scholars such as Dan'el Kahn or Kenneth Kitchen who still believe that the Year 8 Athens stela of king Shepsesre Tefnakht likely belongs to Tefnakht I rather than a hypothetical Tefnakht II who would then have assumed power in 685 BC at Sais—early during the reign of Taharqa, one of the most powerful Nubian rulers of Egypt. Kahn has also stressed at an Egyptological Conference at Leiden that Perdu's epigraphic criteria here in the famed Athens stela—such as the use of the tripartite wig, the method through which the falcon-headed god keeps his head upright in the same stela and on temple wall reliefs contemporary with Tefnakht I's time, the decoration of the stela scene: Heaven supported by wAs scepters—appear already in use in the 24th or early 25th Nubian dynasty during Piye, Shebitku or Bakenranef's reign. The invisible back side of the tripartite wig can be found on the donation stela of Shebitku from Pharbaitos and on the Bakenranef/Bocchoris vase dating to the last days of Piye and the beginning of Shabaka—all appear close in time to the presumed reign of Tefnakht I. Moreover, the head of the falcon-headed god Horus is, as Perdu himself noted, similar in style to the stela of Tefnakht, chief of the Meshwesh and Piye's chief rival.

Unlike Necho I, neither of this king's presumed Saite royal predecessors, a certain Nekauba and Tefnakht II, are monumentally attested in Lower Egypt. Hence, the latter two kings who appear in the records of Manetho's Epitome may well be fictitious. Moreover, it is improbable that Taharqa, perhaps one of the most powerful Kushite kings of the Nubian 25th dynasty for the first 18 years of his reign, would have tolerated the existence of a rival line of native Egyptian kings at Sais during the first half of his reign when he exercised full control over Memphis and the Delta region. After all, the 24th dynasty Saite rulers Tefnakht and Bakenranef had fought Taharqa's father Piye and resisted Shebitku's expansion of Kushite power into the Delta region. According to both Diodorus Siculus, and Plutarch, Tefnakht dishonoured the memory of Menes,Plutarch mentions a pillar at Thebes on which was inscribed an imprecation against Menes as the introducer of luxury.

According to Diodorus, while on campaign in Arabia, Tefnakht ran out of supplies, he was forced to live humbly, in an ordinary home, and enjoyed the experience, as such, he denounced luxury, and pronounced a curse on Menes, who was said to have introduced luxury.
