= Aelian =

Aelian or Aelianus may refer to:

- Aelianus Tacticus, 2nd-century Greek military writer in Rome
- Casperius Aelianus (13–98 AD), Praetorian Prefect, executed by Trajan
- Claudius Aelianus, Roman writer of De Natura Animalium, teacher and historian of the 3rd century, who wrote in Greek
- Lucius Aelianus or Laelian (died 269), one of the thirty tyrants under the Roman empire
- Aelianus Meccius, 2nd-century Greek physician, tutor of Galen
- Tiberius Plautius Silvanus Aelianus, adopted nephew of Plautia Urgulanilla, first wife of Claudius; consul 45 and 74 AD
- Aelian (rebel) (fl. 285), leader of the Bagaudae peasant rebels
- Aelianus (comes), leader of the Roman defensive forces at the Siege of Amida in 359
