= Nakhtubasterau =

Wife of 26th-Dynasty pharaoh Amasis II

Nakhtubasterau in hieroglyphs
n M3 Aa1 t s G29 W1 t t r&r w
Nḫt-bꜣstt-r.w
- Great Royal Wife of Pharaoh Amasis II

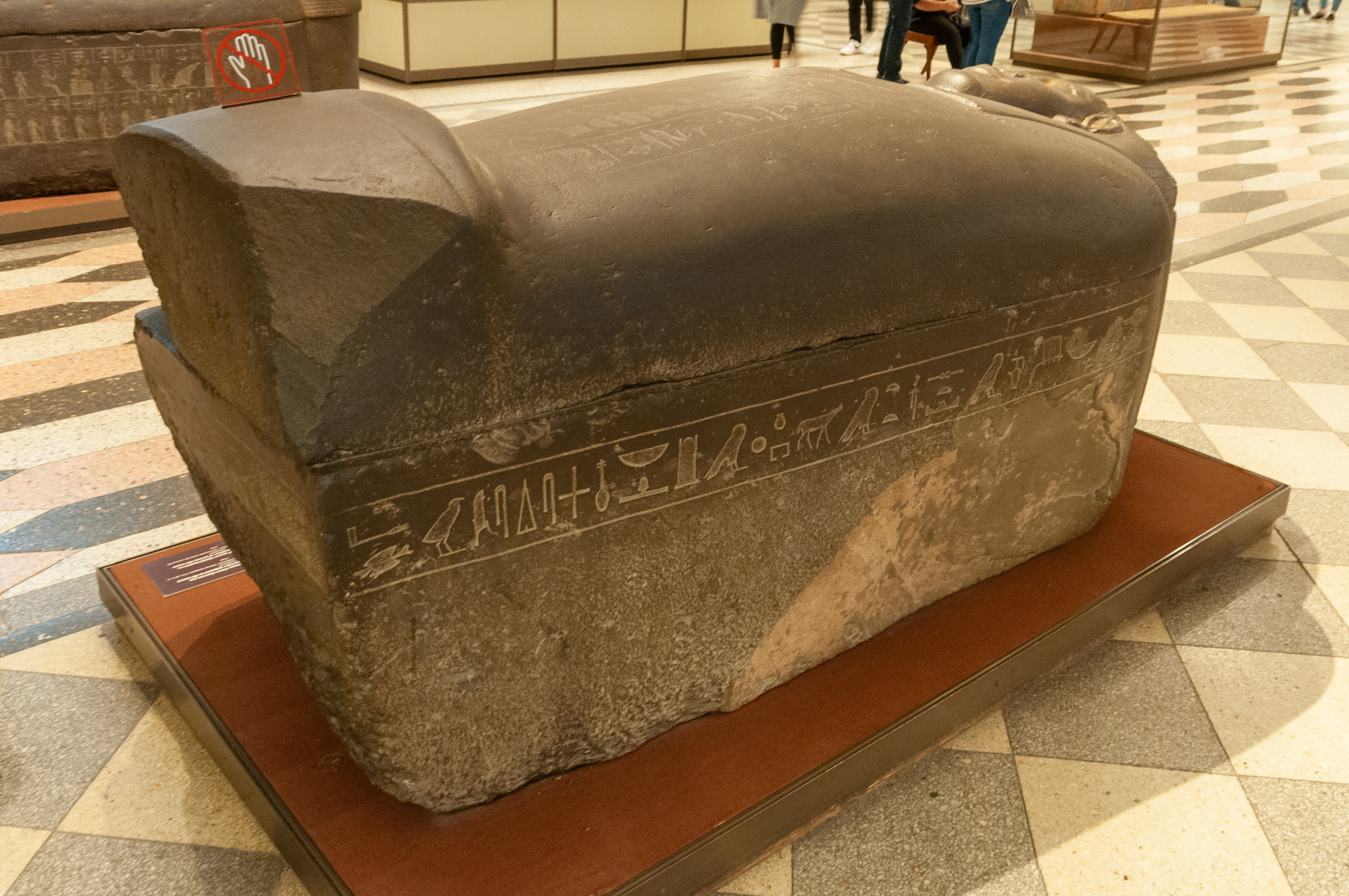
Sarcophagus of Nakhtubasterau

Nakhtubasterau (Nakhtbastetiru) was the Great Royal Wife of Amasis II. She dates to the Twenty-sixth Dynasty of Egypt. Her name honors Bastet.

== Biography ==
Nakhtubasterau was one of the wives known for Pharaoh Amasis II. She is known from a stela from the Serapeum of Saqqara. She held the titles king's wife, his beloved, great one of the hetes sceptre and great of praises.

She was the mother of two sons:

- Pasenenkhonsu, the king's son who donated the Serapeum stela.
- General Ahmose (D), who was buried in Giza.

== Burial ==
Nakhtubasterau was buried in Giza in a rock-cut tomb now numbered G 9550. Her anthropoid black granite sarcophagus is now in Saint Petersburg (767). She was buried with her son Ahmose – sometimes called Amasis – who was a general. The name of the cat-goddess Bastet was chiseled out of Nakhtubasterau's sarcophagus.
