= Aelianus Meccius =

2nd-century Greek physician

Aelianus Meccius (Gr. Αἰλιανὸς Μέκκιος) was an ancient physician, who must have lived in the 2nd century AD, as he is mentioned by Galen as the oldest of his tutors. His father is supposed to have also been a physician, as Aelianus is said by Galen to have made an epitome of his father's anatomical writings. Galen speaks of that part of his work which treated of the Dissection of the Muscles as being held in some repute in his time, and he always mentions his tutor with respect. During the prevalence of an epidemic in Italy, Aelianus is said by Galen to have used the Theriaca with great success, both as a means of cure and also as a preservative against the disease. He must have been a person of some celebrity, as this same anecdote is mentioned by the Arabic historian Abu al-Faraj, with exactly the same circumstances except that he makes the epidemic to have broken out at Antioch instead of in Italy. None of his works are now extant.
