= Nekauba =

- Nechepsos

King of Sais
- Reign: 678 – 672 BC
- Predecessor: Tefnakht II?
- Successor: Necho I
Royal titulary
- Father: Tefnakht II?
- Dynasty: "Proto-saite" Dynasty

Almost nothing is known of Nekauba (Ancient Greek: Νεχεψὼς Nekhepsṑs). He is listed as one of the early kings of the 26th Saite Dynasty in Manetho's Epitome and ruled for six years. However, any contemporary documents do not confirm his status as king, and he may well be an invention of later Saite rulers to legitimize their kingship. Manetho writes that Nekauba is supposed to have succeeded Stephinates, the founder of the 26th Dynasty—perhaps Tefnakht II—and was, in turn, followed by the well-known Necho I, father of Psamtik I. Nekauba would have reigned as a local Saite king under the 25th Nubian Dynasty between 678 BC to 672 BC if he did have an independent reign. If not, he would merely have been a local mayor of Sais who served in office during this period before the accession of King Necho I.

The Egyptologist Kenneth Kitchen has suggested that Nekauba's reign be raised by a decade from six to 16 years, though this seems somewhat ambitious for such an obscure ruler. It appears far more economical to adopt, at face value, Manetho's far shorter figure of only six years. This may suggest that only a small amount of time passed between the reign of Tefnakht II and the accession of Necho I.

It is probable that Nekauba and Necho I were both sons of Tefnakht II.

== Doubtful existence ==
In 2002, Olivier Perdu published a newly discovered Year 2 donation stela found near Sebennytos, which dates to Necho I's reign. Perdu revealed that it is close in style, form, and content to the Year 8 donation stela of Shepsesre Tefnakht I, hence suggesting that these two Saite kings were close contemporaries and that Tefnakht I would have ruled Sais around 685 BC-678 BC, just before Nekauba and Necho I, thus equating him with Tefnakht II. Perdu's arguments are not accepted by many Egyptologists, who have criticized the epigraphic criteria he used.

In 2011, Kim Ryholt assumed that Nekauba's name translates as "Necho the Wise" and that Nekauba or Nechepsos' name refers to Necho II instead. Ryholt maintained that there was no independent Saite king named Nekauba who intervened between Tefnakht II and Necho I. Ryholt also stressed that possible evidence for the removal of an intervening king between Tefnakht II and Necho I was provided by Perdu's aforementioned argument concerning the similarity of the two stelae (although Ryholt attributed the Year 8 stela to Tefnakht II instead); the attribution of 6 years to Nekauba would separate the two stelae by a minimum of seven years, whereas if Nekauba did not exist, the two stelae might have been produced within one to two years since Necho I would have been Tefnakht II's immediate successor.

Preceded by Tefnakht II?	Pharaoh of Egypt; 678 – 672 BC; Twenty-sixth Dynasty	Succeeded by Necho I
