= Tentkheta =

Great Royal Wife of Amasis II of Egypt

Tentkheta in hieroglyphs
U33 n t Aa1 t U30 N25
Tɜ-nt-ḫtɜ
She from the land of the Hittites
- Great Royal Wife of Pharaoh Amasis II

Tentkheta (Tanetkheta) was the Great Royal Wife of Amasis II. She dates to the Twenty-sixth Dynasty of Egypt.

== Biography ==
Tentkheta was one of the wives known for Pharaoh Amasis II. She was a daughter of a priest of Ptah named Padineith. She was the mother of a King's son named Khnum-ib-Re and the mother of Pharaoh Psamtik III. Tentkheta held the titles king's wife (hmt nswt) and overseer of the affairs of the acacia house (khrp seshmtiw shendjet).
