= Amasis II =

Egyptian pharaoh from 570 to 526 BC

- Ahmose II
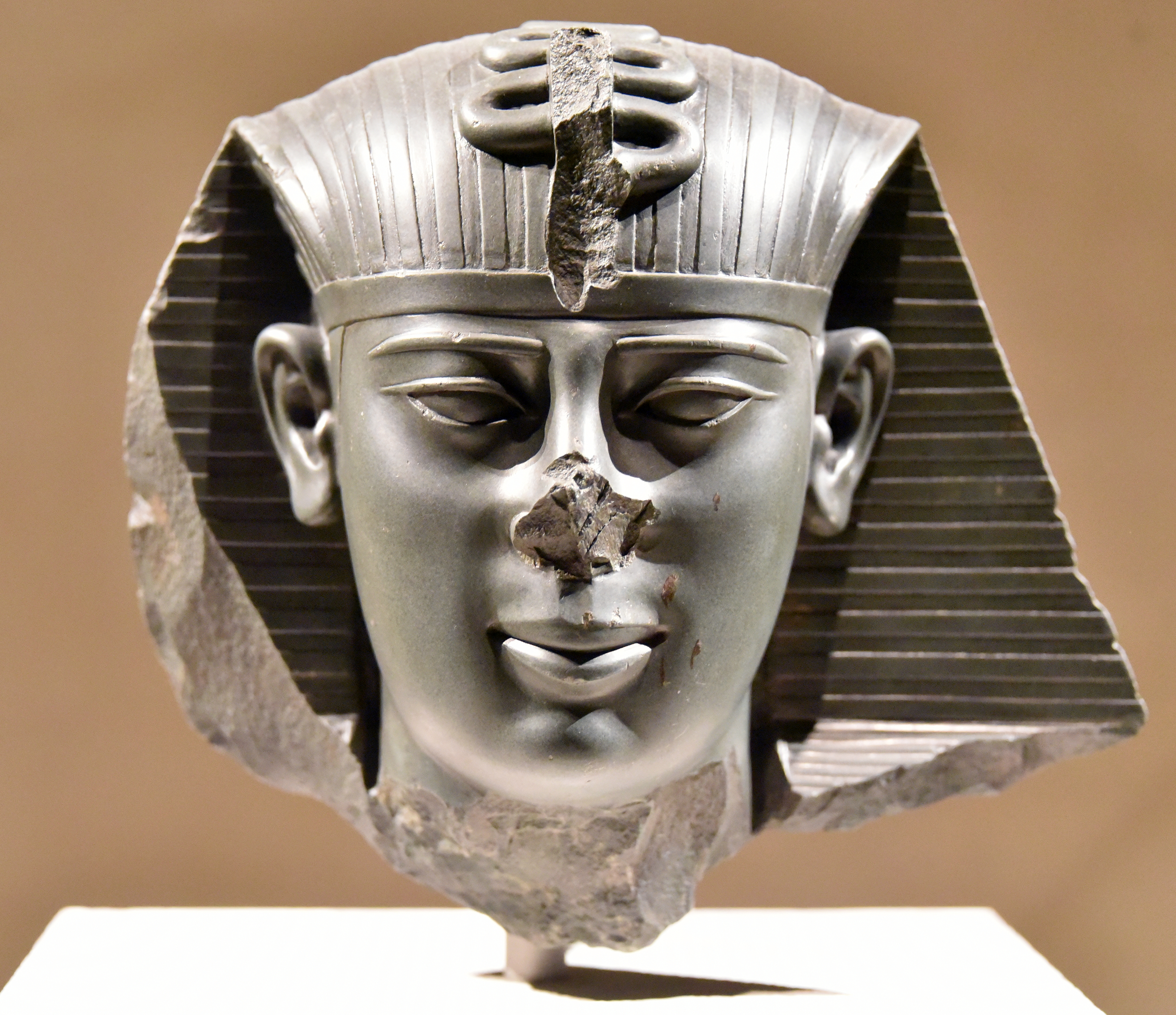
- Head of Amasis II, c. 550 BCE

Pharaoh
- Reign: 570–526 BCE
- Predecessor: Apries
- Successor: Psamtik III
Royal titulary
Horus name
Semen Maat
The one who has established Maat
G5	s mn n U1 mAa t
Nebty name
Sa Neith seped tawy
The son of Neith, who has restored the Two Lands
G16	R24 zA M44 N17 N17
Golden Horus
Setep netjeru
Divinely chosen
G8	nTrw stp
Prenomen
Khenem-ib-re
He Who Embraces the Heart of Re Forever

M23 X1 L2 X1	ra W9 m ib
Nomen
Iaḥmos Net-za
The Moon is Born, Son of Neith

G39 N5	N12 ms R24 zA
- Consorts: Tentkheta, mother of Psamtik III; Nakhtubasterau; Ladice; Khedebneithirbinet II? (daughter of Apries); Tadiasir?
- Children: Psamtik III; Pasenenkhonsu; Ahmose (D); Tashereniset II ? Nitocris II
- Mother: Tashereniset I
- Born: circa 615/606 BCE
- Died: 526 BCE. (aged c. 80s)
- Burial: Temple of Neith at Sais
- Dynasty: 26th dynasty

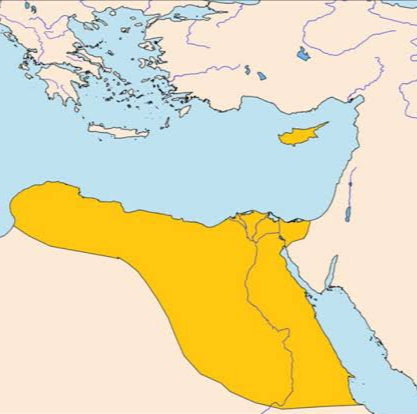
Ancient Egypt under Amasis II

Amasis II (Ancient Greek: Ἄμασις Ámasis; Phoenician: 𐤇𐤌𐤎 ḤMS) or Ahmose II was a pharaoh (reigned 570 – 526 BCE) of the Twenty-sixth Dynasty of Egypt, the successor of Apries at Sais. He was the last great ruler of Egypt before the Persian conquest. He was also the first pharaoh to conquer Cyprus after Thutmose III.

== Life ==
Most of our information about him is derived from Herodotus (2.161ff) and can only be imperfectly verified by monumental evidence. According to the Greek historian, he was of common origins. He was originally an officer in the Egyptian army. His birthplace was Siuph at Saïs. He took part in a general campaign of Pharaoh Psamtik II in 592 BC in Nubia.

A revolt which broke out among native Egyptian soldiers gave him his opportunity to seize the throne. These troops, returning home from a disastrous military expedition to Cyrene in Libya, suspected that they had been betrayed in order that Apries, the reigning king, might rule more absolutely by means of his Greek mercenaries; many Egyptians fully sympathized with them. General Amasis, sent to meet them and quell the revolt, was proclaimed king by the rebels instead, and Apries, who then had to rely entirely on his mercenaries, was defeated (though it is suggested that Apries had more native support than classical sources describe). Apries then fled to an "island" (possibly an elevated or isolated base of Apries within Egypt) and was killed while mounting a final insurrection against Amasis in 567 BCE with the aid of a shipped force (probably Greek and maybe Carian), while the Babylonians also invaded Egypt the same year. An inscription confirms the struggle between the native Egyptian and the foreign soldiery, and proves that Apries was killed and honourably buried in the fourth year of Amasis (c. 567 BCE). Amasis' revolt against Apries is also alluded to in Jeremiah 44:30. Amasis then married Khedebneithirbinet II, one of the daughters of his predecessor Apries, in order to legitimise his kingship.

Some information is known about the family origins of Amasis: his mother was a certain Tashereniset, as a bust of her, today located in the British Museum, shows. A stone block from Mehallet el-Kubra also establishes that his maternal grandmother—Tashereniset's mother—was a certain Tjenmutetj.

His court is relatively well known. The head of the gate guard Ahmose-sa-Neith appears on numerous monuments, including the location of his sarcophagus. He was referenced on monuments of the 30th Dynasty and apparently had a special significance in his time. Wahibre was 'Leader of the southern foreigners' and 'Head of the doors of foreigners', so he was the highest official for border security. Under Amasis the career of the doctor, Udjahorresnet, began, who was of particular importance to the Persians. Several "heads of the fleet" are known. Psamtek Meryneit and Pasherientaihet / Padineith are the only known viziers.

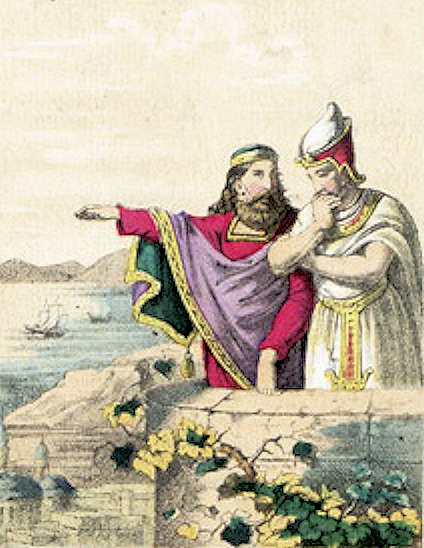
Polycrates, Tyrant of Samos, with Pharaoh Amasis II.

Herodotus describes how Amasis II would eventually cause a confrontation with the Persian armies. According to Herodotus, Amasis was asked by Cambyses II or Cyrus the Great for an Egyptian ophthalmologist on good terms. Amasis seems to have complied by forcing an Egyptian physician into mandatory labor, causing him to leave his family behind in Egypt and move to Persia in forced exile. In an attempt to exact revenge for this, the physician grew very close to Cambyses and suggested that Cambyses should ask Amasis for a daughter in marriage in order to solidify his bonds with the Egyptians. Cambyses complied and requested a daughter of Amasis for marriage.

Amasis, worrying that his daughter would be a concubine to the Persian king, refused to give up his offspring; Amasis also was not willing to take on the Persian empire, so he concocted a deception in which he forced Nitetis, the daughter of the ex-pharaoh Apries, whom Herodotus explicitly confirms to have been killed by Amasis, to go to Persia instead of his own offspring.

Nitetis, who was, as per Herodotus's account, "tall and beautiful", naturally betrayed Amasis and upon being greeted by the Persian king explained Amasis's trickery and her true origins. This infuriated Cambyses and he vowed to take revenge for it. Amasis died before Cambyses reached him, but his heir and son Psamtik III was defeated by the Persians.

Herodotus also describes how, just like his predecessor, Amasis relied on Greek mercenaries and councilmen. One such figure was Phanes of Halicarnassus, who would later leave Amasis, for reasons that Herodotus does not clearly know, but suspects were personal between the two figures. Amasis sent one of his eunuchs to capture Phanes, but the eunuch was bested by the wise councilman and Phanes fled to Persia, meeting up with Cambyses and providing advice for his invasion of Egypt. Egypt was finally lost to the Persians during the battle of Pelusium in 525 BC.

== Egypt's wealth ==
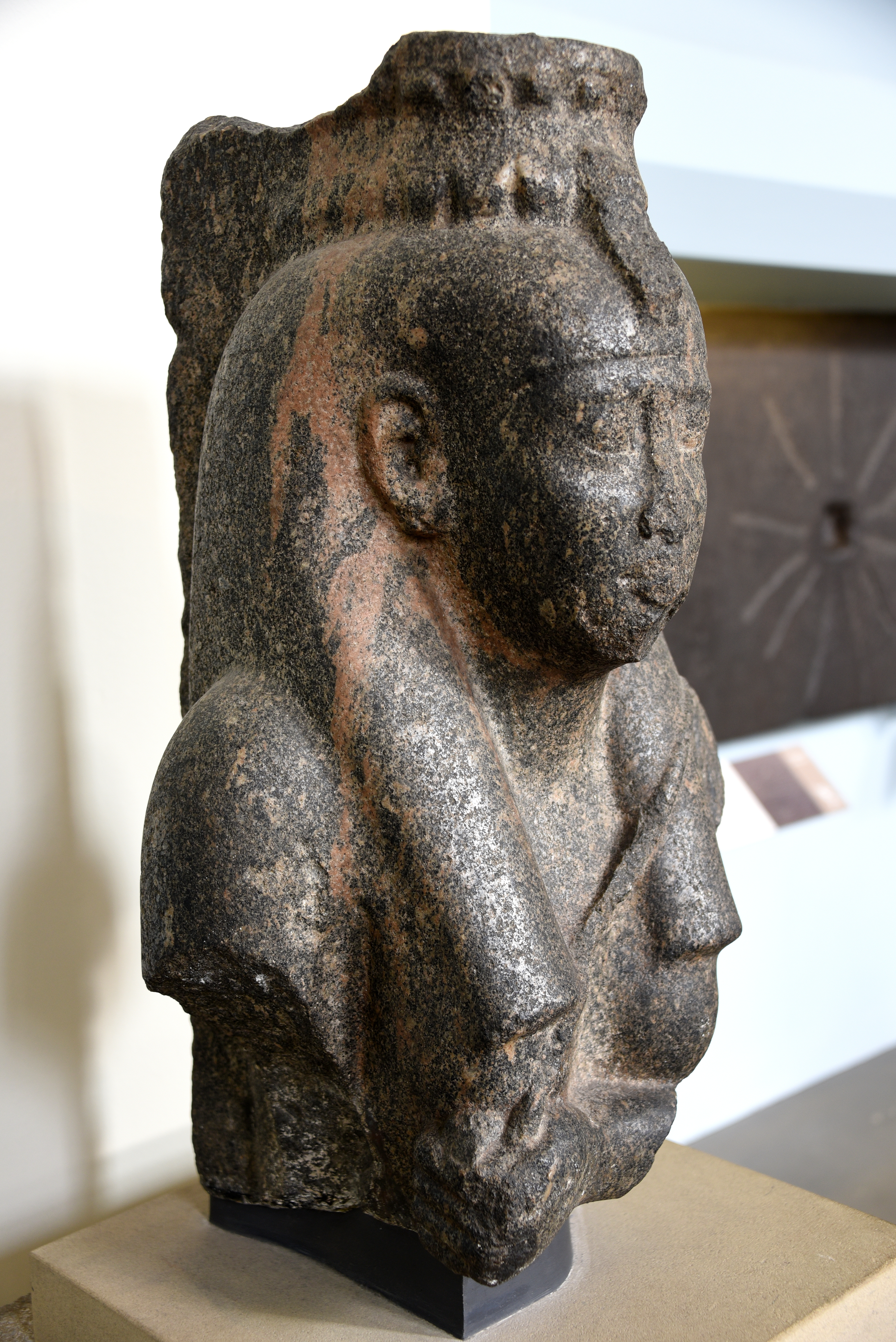
Statue of Tasherenese, mother of king Amasis II, 570–526 BCE, British Museum

Amasis brought Egypt into closer contact with Greece than ever before. Herodotus relates that under his prudent administration, Egypt reached a new level of wealth; Amasis adorned the temples of Lower Egypt especially with splendid monolithic shrines and other monuments (his activity here is proved by existing remains). For example, a shrine built by him was excavated at Tell Nebesha.

Amasis was described by Herodotus as a philhellene. He assigned the commercial colony of Naucratis on the Canopic branch of the Nile to the Greeks, and when the temple of Delphi was burnt, he contributed 1,000 talents to the rebuilding. He also married a Greek princess named Ladice daughter of King Battus III and made alliances with Polycrates of Samos and Croesus of Lydia. Montaigne cites the story by Herodotus that Ladice cured Amasis of his impotence by praying to Aphrodite.

Under Amasis, Egypt's agricultural based economy reached its zenith. Herodotus, who visited Egypt less than a century after Amasis II's death, writes that:

It is said that it was during the reign of Ahmose II (Amasis) that Egypt attained its highest level of prosperity both in respect of what the river gave the land and in respect of what the land yielded to men and that the number of inhabited cities at that time reached in total 20,000.

His kingdom consisted probably of Egypt only, as far as the First Cataract, but to this he added Cyprus, and his influence was great in Cyrene, Libya.

According to Herodotus Amasis II strengthened his influence in Cyrene when he married its Greek princess Ladice of Cyrene; may be there was an additional reason, such as a desire for a Greek woman.

In his fourth year, around 568–567 BC, Egypt was invaded by the Babylonians, under the leadership of Nebuchadnezzar II. This assault was recorded by a fragmentary Babylonian inscription, with the modern designation BM 33041; the inscription from that year records the word "Egypt" as well as possible traces of the name "Amasis". A stele of Amasis from the 4th year of his reign in 567 BC, also fragmentary, may also describe a combined naval and land attack by the Babylonians. Recent evidence suggests that the Babylonians were initially successful during the invasion and gained a foothold in Egypt, but they were repelled by Amasis' forces. It is believed that this forced Nebuchadnezzar II to retire plans to conquer Amasis' kingdom. (However, some have suggested that Nebuchadnezzar came to defeat Apries, with the combined forces of Amasis and Nebuchadnezzar managing to kill him, securing Amasis' throne, though as vassal king.) Amasis was later faced with another formidable enemy with the rise of Persia under Cyrus who ascended to the throne in 559 BCE; his final years were preoccupied by the threat of the impending Persian onslaught against Egypt. With great strategic skill, Cyrus had destroyed Lydia in 546 BCE and finally defeated the Babylonians in 538 BCE which left Amasis with no major Near Eastern allies to counter Persia's increasing military might. Amasis reacted by cultivating closer ties with the Greek states to counter the future Persian invasion into Egypt but died in 526 BCE shortly before the Persians attacked. The final assault instead fell upon his son Psamtik III, whom the Persians defeated in 525 BCE after he had reigned for only six months.

== Tomb and desecration ==
Amasis II died in 526 BC. He was buried at the royal necropolis of Sais within the temple enclosure of Neith, and while his tomb has not been rediscovered, Herodotus describes it for us:

[It is] a great cloistered building of stone, decorated with pillars carved in the imitation of palm-trees, and other costly ornaments. Within the cloister is a chamber with double doors, and behind the doors stands the sepulchre.

Herodotus also relates the desecration of Amasis' mummy when the Persian king Cambyses conquered Egypt and thus ended the 26th (Saite) Dynasty:

No sooner did [Cambyses] enter the palace of Amasis that he gave orders for his [Amasis's] body to be taken from the tomb where it lay. This done, he proceeded to have it treated with every possible indignity, such as beating it with whips, sticking it with goads, and plucking its hairs... As the body had been embalmed and would not fall to pieces under the blows, Cambyses had it burned.

== Later reputation ==
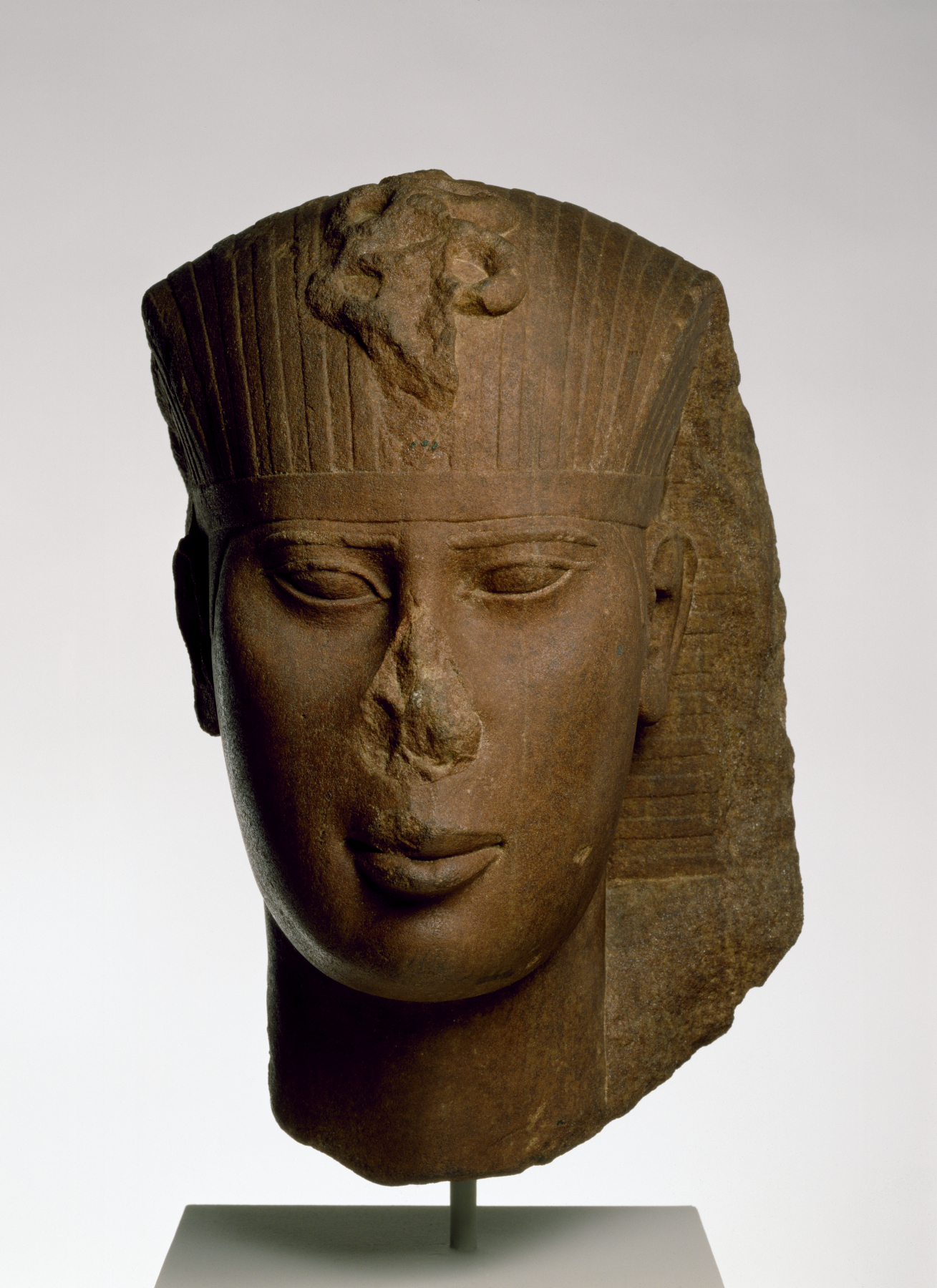
This head probably came from a temple statue of Amasis II. He wears the traditional royal nemes head cloth, with a protective uraeus serpent at the brow. Circa 560 BCE. Walters Art Museum, Baltimore.

From the fifth century BCE, there is evidence of stories circulating about Amasis, in Egyptian sources (including a demotic papyrus of the third century BCE), Herodotus, Hellanikos, and Plutarch's Convivium Septem Sapientium. 'In those tales Amasis was presented as a non-conventional Pharaoh, behaving in ways unbecoming to a king but gifted with practical wisdom and cunning, a trickster on the throne or a kind of comic Egyptian Solomon'.

For example, Herodotus relates that, when the Egyptians disrespected Amasis for having been born a commoner, he had his golden footbath (ποδανιπτήρ) melted down, made into a statue of a god, and placed in the centre of city where people would worship it. After the people of that city had worshipped and "did great reverence" to it, Amasis gathered them and declared to them that the golden image they now worshipped had once been a footbath where people would vomit, urinate and wash their feet. He claimed that likewise, although he was once a man of the people, he was now their king and they ought to fittingly respect him.

On another occasion, Herodotus tells that Amasis' friends admonished him for spending his time frivolously instead of on governing the country. He responded to them that archers stretch their bows only when they need them, because if they kept them constantly stretched the bows would break. "So also is the state of man: if he should always be in earnest and not relax himself for sport at the due time, he would either go mad or be struck with stupor before he was aware; and knowing this well, I distribute a portion of the time to each of the two ways of living."

== Gallery of images ==
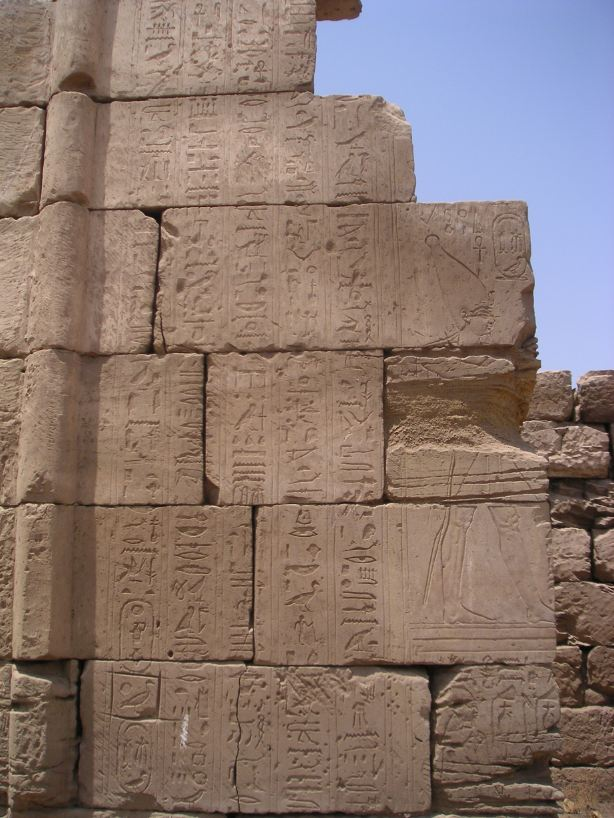
Relief showing Amasis from the Karnak temple

Papyrus, written in demotic script in the 35th year of Amasis II, on display at the Louvre

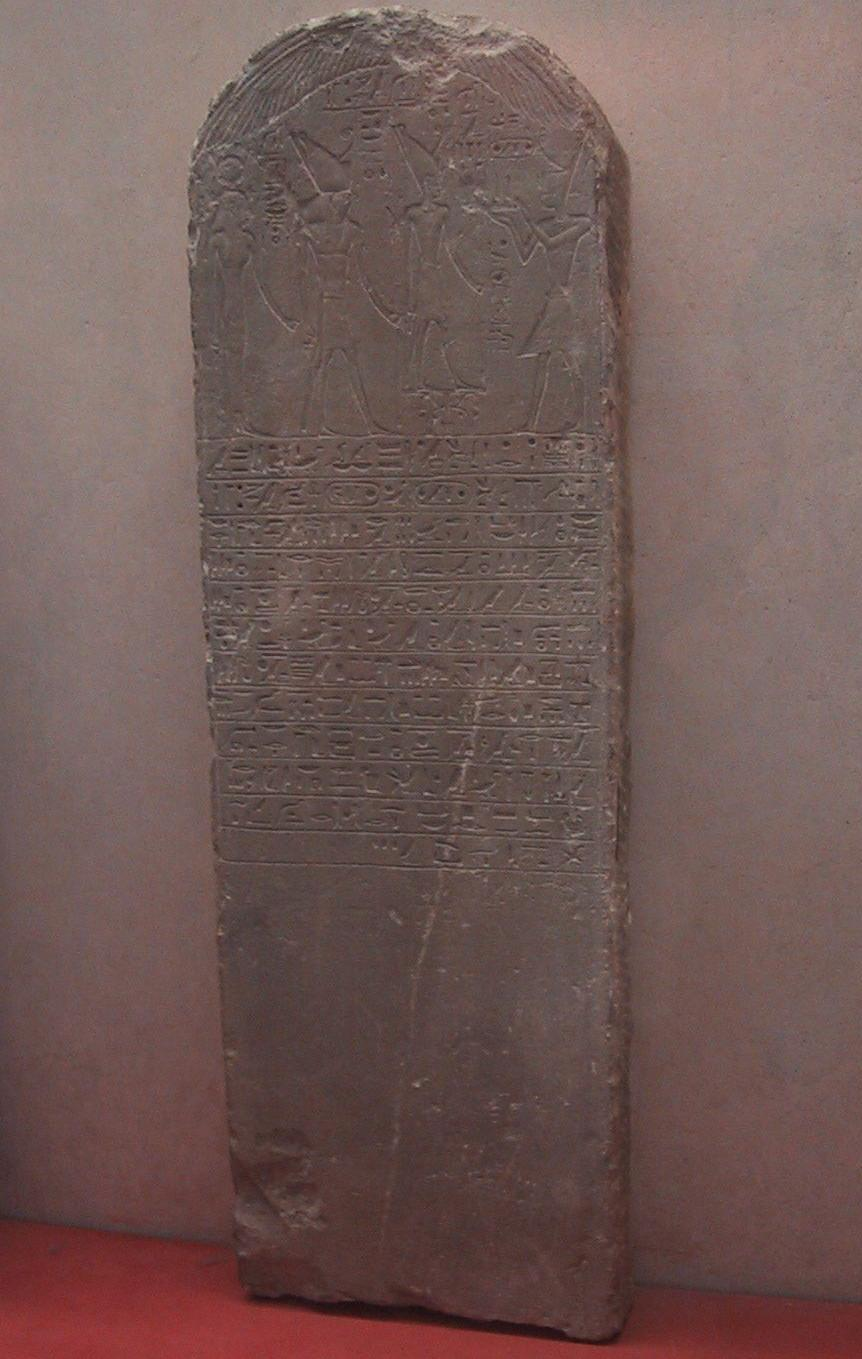
Grant of a parcel of land by an individual to a temple. Dated to the first year of Amasis II, on display at the Louvre

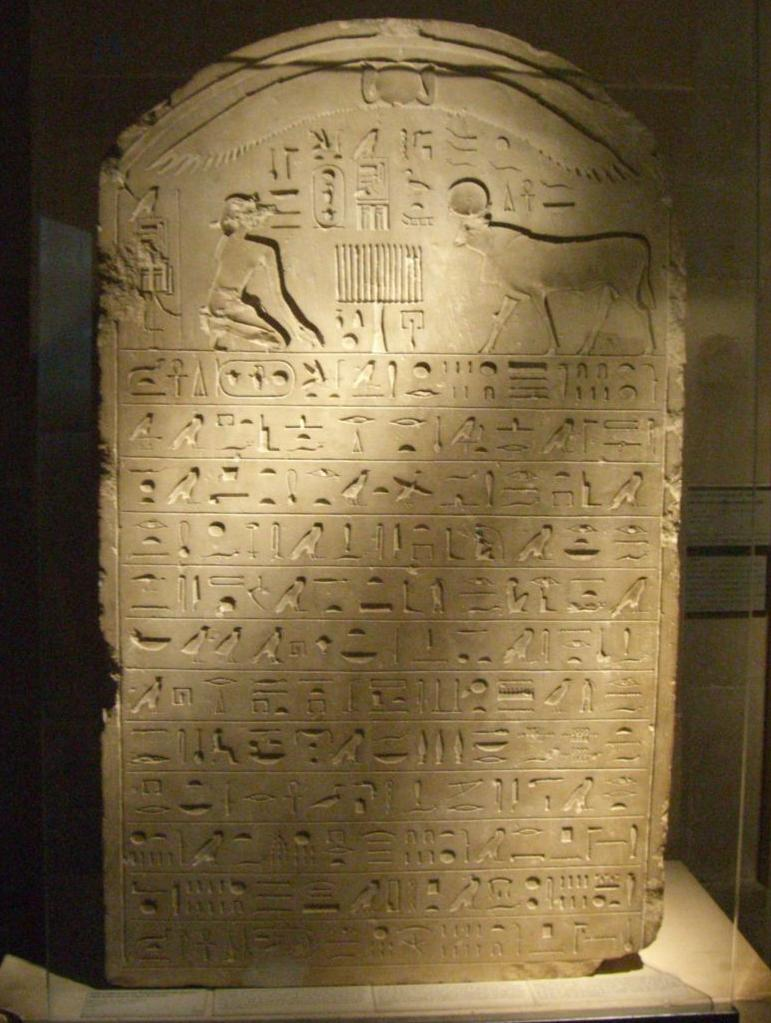
A stele dating to the 23rd regnal year of Amasis, on display at the Louvre
