= Psamtik III =

Egyptian pharaoh from 526 BC to 525 BC

- Psammetichus III
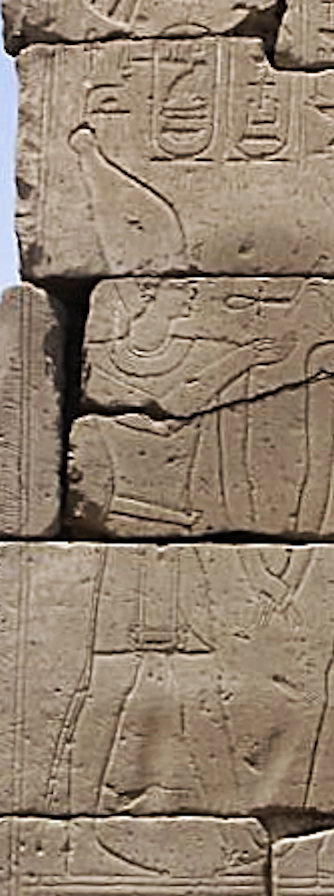
- Relief depicting Psamtik III from a chapel in Karnak

Pharaoh
- Reign: 526–525 BC
- Predecessor: Amasis II
- Successor: Cambyses II, Second Ruler of Persia
Royal titulary
Prenomen
Ankhkaenre

M23 X1 L2 X1	ra anx kA n
Nomen
Psamtik

G39 N5	p s m T k
- Children: Amasis
- Died: 525 BC
- Dynasty: 26th dynasty

Psamtik III (Ancient Egyptian: ꜥnḫ-kꜣ-n-Rꜥ Psmṯk, pronounced Psamāṯək), known by the Graeco-Romans as Psammetichus or Psammeticus (Ancient Greek: Ψαμμήτιχος), or Psammenitus (Ancient Greek: Ψαμμήνιτος), was the last Pharaoh of the Twenty-sixth Dynasty of Egypt from 526 BC to 525 BC. Most of what is known about his reign and life was documented by the Greek historian Herodotus in the 5th century BC. Herodotus states that Psamtik had ruled Egypt for only six months before he was confronted by a Persian invasion of his country led by King Cambyses II of Persia. Psamtik was subsequently defeated at the Battle of Pelusium, and fled to Memphis where he was captured. The deposed pharaoh was carried off to Susa in chains, and later committed suicide.

== Family ==
Psamtik III was the son of the pharaoh Amasis II and one of his wives, Queen Tentkheta. He succeeded his father as pharaoh in 526 BC, when Amasis died after a long and prosperous reign of some 44 years. According to Herodotus, he had a son named Amasis and a wife and daughter, both unnamed in historical documents.

== Defeat and imprisonment ==
Psamtik ruled Egypt for no more than six months. A few days after his coronation, rain fell at Thebes, which was a rare event that frightened some Egyptians, who interpreted this as a bad omen. The young and inexperienced pharaoh was no match for the invading Persians. After the Persians, under Cambyses, had crossed the Sinai desert with the aid of the Arabians, a battle was fought near Pelusium, a city on Egypt's eastern frontier, in the spring of 525 BC and the Egyptians were defeated. Consequently, Psamtik and his army were compelled to withdraw to Memphis. The Persians captured the city after a long siege, and, subsequently Psamtik himself. Shortly thereafter, Cambyses ordered the public execution of two thousand of the principal citizens, including (according to some sources) a son of the fallen pharaoh.

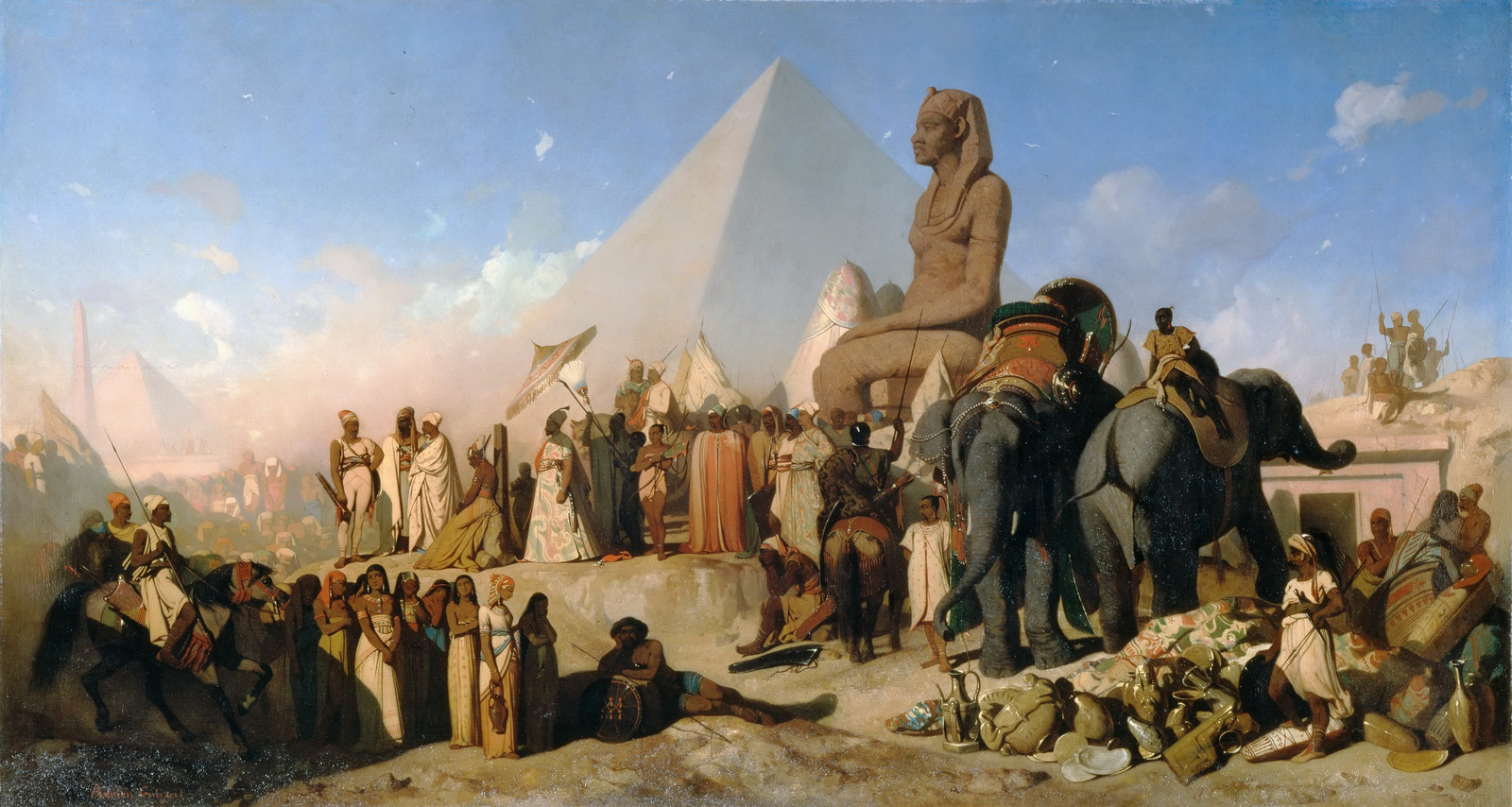
Meeting Between Cambyses II and Psammetichus III painted by Jean-Adrien Guignet.

== Captivity and suicide ==
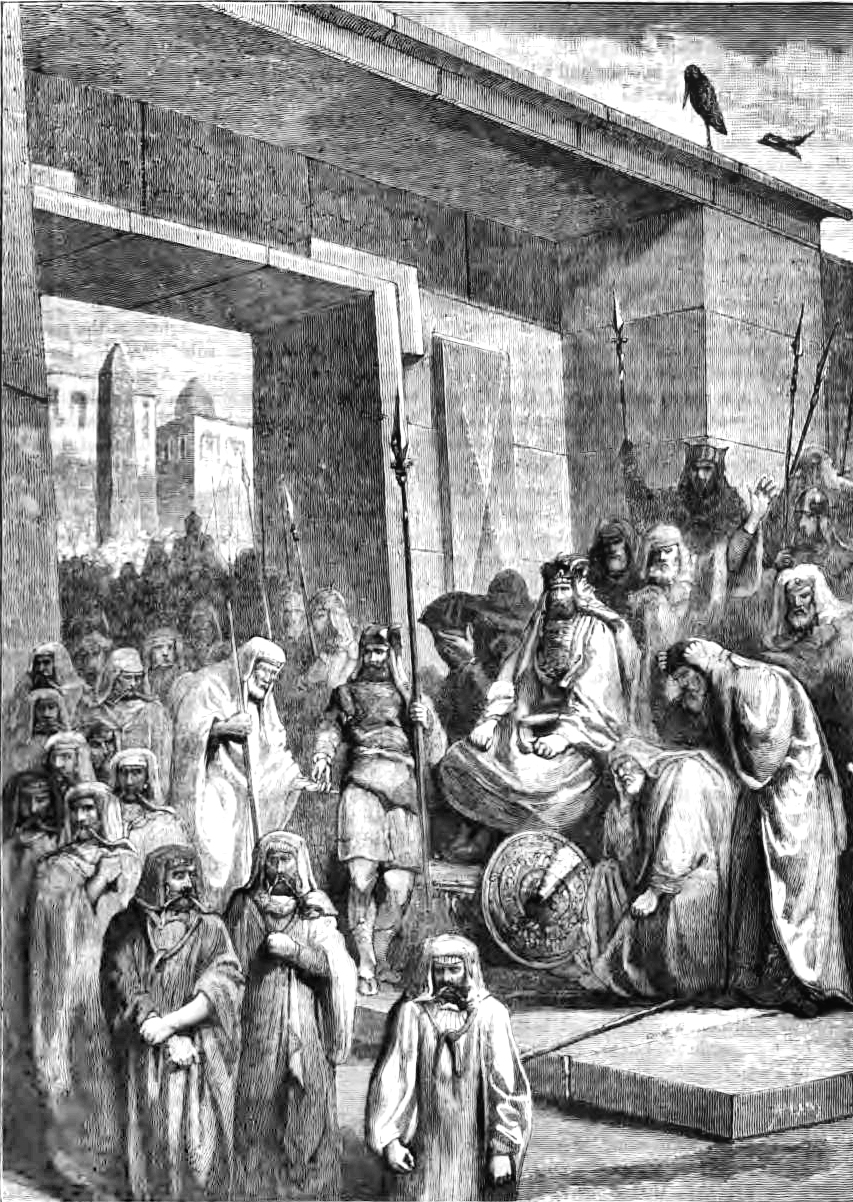
Psamtik III surrendering to Cambyses (19th century illustration).

Psamtik's captivity and subsequent suicide are described in The Histories by Herodotus, Book III, sections 14 and 15. Psamtik's daughter and the daughters of all the Egyptian noblemen were enslaved. Psamtik's son and two thousand other sons of noblemen were sentenced to death, in retaliation for the murder of the Persian ambassador and the two hundred crew of his boat. An "old man who had once been the king's friend" was reduced to beggary. All these people were brought before Psamtik to test his reaction, and he only became upset after seeing the state of the beggar.

Psamtik's compassion for the beggar caused him to be spared, but his son had already been executed. The deposed pharaoh was then raised up to live in the entourage of the Persian King in Susa, the Persian capital. After a while, however, Psamtik attempted to raise a rebellion among the Egyptians. When Cambyses learned of this, Psamtik is reported by Herodotus to have drunk bull's blood and immediately died.
