= Bakenranef =

Egyptian pharaoh

- Bocchoris
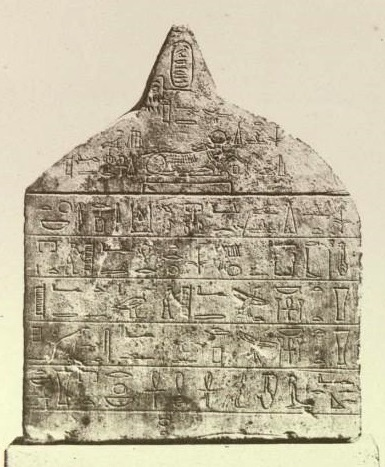
- Apis stela dated to Year 6 of Bakenranef's reign, found in Saqqara.

Pharaoh
- Reign: 718–713 BC
- Predecessor: Tefnakht
- Successor: Monarchy abolished
Royal titulary
Prenomen
Wahkare
Constant is the Heart of Re

M23 X1 L2 X1	N5 V29 D28
Nomen
Bakenranef
Servant in his name

G39 N5	G29 V31 n r&n&f
- Father: Tefnakht
- Dynasty: 24th Dynasty (Western Delta)

Bakenranef, known by the ancient Greeks as Bocchoris (Ancient Greek: Βόκχωρις, Bókkhōris; Latin: Bocchoris) or Bochchoris (Βόχχωρις, Bókhkhōris; Latin: Bochchoris) was briefly a king of the 24th Dynasty of Egypt. Based at Sais in the western Delta, he ruled Lower Egypt from c. 718 to 713 BC. Though the Ptolemaic period Egyptian historian Manetho considers him the sole member of the 24th Dynasty, modern scholars include his father Tefnakht in that dynasty. Although Sextus Julius Africanus quotes Manetho as stating that "Bocchoris" ruled for six years, some modern scholars again differ and assign him a shorter reign of only five years, based on evidence from an Apis Bull burial stela. It establishes that Bakenranef's reign ended only at the start of his 6th regnal year which, under the Egyptian dating system, means he had a reign of 5 full years. Bakenranef's prenomen or royal name, Wahkare, means "Constant is the Spirit of Re" in Egyptian.

== Literary sources ==
Manetho is the source for two events from Bakenranef's reign. The first is the story that a lamb uttered the prophecy that Egypt would be conquered by the Assyrians, the story of a lamb was repeated by Claudius Aelianus, however he goes into detail describing the creature as having been born with eight feet, two tails, two heads and four horns. The second was that Bakenranef was captured by Shebitku, a king of the 25th Dynasty, who executed Bakenrenef by having him burned alive. A Kushite king, Shebitku extended his rule over the whole of Egypt, which had been split since the 21st Dynasty.

Diodorus Siculus, writing about three centuries after Manetho, adds some different details. Diodorus states that although Bakenranef was "contemptible in appearance", he was wiser than all prior kings of Egypt.. The Egyptians attributed to him a law concerning contracts, which provided for a way to discharge debts where no bond was signed; it was observed down to Diodorus' time (1.79). For this, and other acts, Diodorus included "Bocchoris" as one of the six most important lawgivers of ancient Egypt. For a minor kinglet briefly in control of the Nile Delta, this is an unexpectedly prominent ranking: "He was a surprising choice," Robin Lane Fox observes, "Perhaps some Greeks, unknown to us, had had close dealings with him; from his reign we have scarab-seals bearing his Egyptian name, one of which found its way into a contemporary Greek grave on Ischia up near the Bay of Naples." Ischia was the earliest of eighth-century BC Greek colonies in Italy.

The Roman historian Tacitus mentions that many Greek and Roman writers thought he had a part in the origin of the Jewish nation:

Most writers, however, agree in stating that once a disease, which horribly disfigured the body, broke out over Egypt; that king Bocchoris, seeking a remedy, consulted the oracle of Hammon, and was bidden to cleanse his realm, and to convey into some foreign land this race detested by the gods. The people, who had been collected after diligent search, finding themselves left in a desert, sat for the most part in a stupor of grief, till one of the exiles, Moses by name, warned them not to look for any relief from God or man, forsaken as they were of both, but to trust to themselves, taking for their heaven-sent leader that man who should first help them to be quit of their present misery. They agreed, and in utter ignorance began to advance at random. Nothing, however, distressed them so much as the scarcity of water, and they had sunk ready to perish in all directions over the plain, when a herd of wild asses was seen to retire from their pasture to a rock shaded by trees. Moses followed them, and, guided by the appearance of a grassy spot, discovered an abundant spring of water. This furnished relief. After a continuous journey for six days, on the seventh they possessed themselves of a country, from which they expelled the inhabitants, and in which they founded a city and a temple.

— Tacitus, Histories, 5.3

Plutarch, in his Moralia, calls Bakenranef a man of quote "a very cruel nature", Aelian concurs, saying of him: "Bocchoris the King of Egypt acquired — I do not know how — a false reputation and a fictitious renown and appeared to be just in his judgments and to have his heart set on righteousness. But by nature, it seems, he was the reverse." He then writes, "how from a desire to cause pain to the people of Egypt, he treated Mnevis. He set a wild bull against him. So Mnevis began to bellow and the newcomer bellowed in answer. And then the stranger rushed forward in anger intending to fall upon the bull beloved of the god, but tripped and falling against the stem of a persea-tree, broke his horn, whereupon Mnevis wounded him in the flank and killed him. Bocchoris was put to shame and the Egyptians loathed him."

Shebitku deposed and executed Bakenranef by burning him alive at the stake. This effectively ended the short-lived 24th Dynasty of Egypt as a potential rival to the Nubian 25th Dynasty. Although the Manethonic and classical traditions maintain that it was Shebitku's invasion which brought Egypt under Kushite rule, the king burning his opponent, Bocchoris-Bakenranef, alive, there is no direct evidence that Shebitku did slay Bakenranef, and although earlier scholarship generally accepted the tradition, it has recently been treated more sceptically.

=== Legal reforms ===
King Bakenranef has been credited with initiating a land reform, but the brevity of his reign and the small geographical extent of the area he ruled, together with the indirect character of the historical evidence for it, has cast some doubt upon this. Diodorus credits Bakenranef with abolishing debt slavery, a claim based upon a now-lost work by the historian Hecateus of Abdera. It is possible that Hecateus invented the story in order to support an ideological debate over debt slavery in Greek society.

== Contemporary records ==
Despite the importance implied by these writers, few contemporary records of Bakenranef have survived. The chief inscription of his reign concerns the death and burial of an Apis bull during Years 5 and 6 of his reign; the remainder are a few stelae that Auguste Mariette recovered while excavating the Serapeum of Saqqara. In a tomb in Tarquinia in Italy was found an inscribed vase with his names.

Preceded by Tefnakht	Pharaoh of Egypt; 24th Dynasty	Succeeded by Conquered by Shebitku
