= Twenty-fourth Dynasty of Egypt =

Ancient Egyptian dynasty

- 732 BC – 720 BC
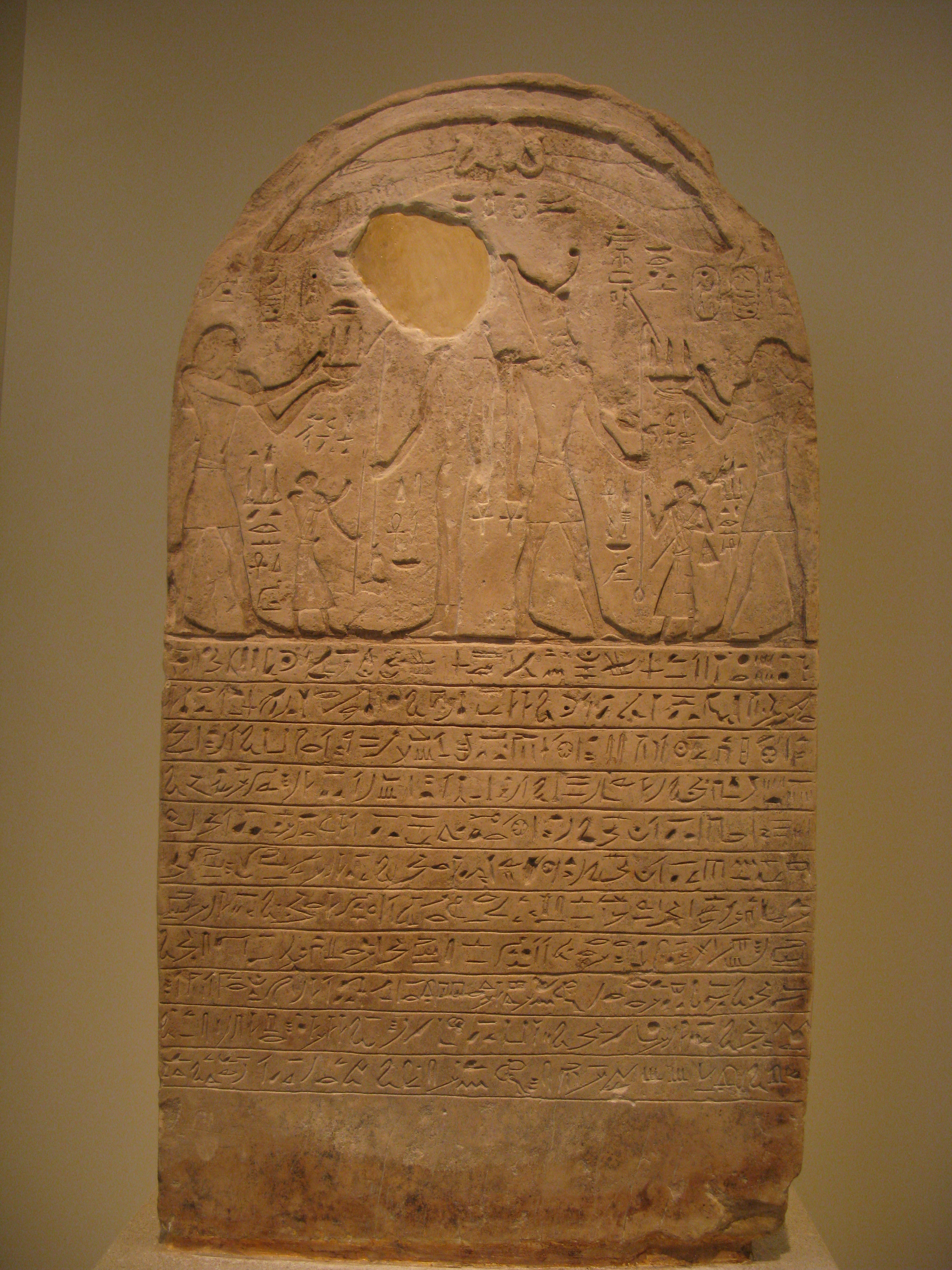
- Stela of Tefnakht
- Capital: Sais
- Common languages: Egyptian language
- Religion: Ancient Egyptian Religion
- Government: Absolute monarchy
- Pharaoh
  - 732–725 BC: Tefnakht
  - 725–720 BC: Bakenranef
- Historical era: Third Intermediate Period of Egypt
  - Conquests of Tefnakht: 732 BC
  - Deposition of Bakenranef: 720 BC
Preceded by	Succeeded by
Twenty-second Dynasty of Egypt	Twenty-fifth Dynasty of Egypt

The Twenty-fourth Dynasty of Egypt (notated Dynasty XXIV, alternatively 24th Dynasty or Dynasty 24) is usually classified as the fourth Dynasty of the Ancient Egyptian Third Intermediate Period.

== History ==
The Twenty-Fourth Dynasty was a short-lived group of pharaohs who had their capital at Sais in the western Nile Delta.

=== Tefnakht I ===
Tefnakht I formed an alliance of the Delta kinglets, with whose support he attempted to conquer Upper Egypt; his campaign attracted the attention of the Nubian king, Piye, who recorded his conquest and subjection of Tefnakhte of Sais and his peers in a well-known inscription. Tefnakht is always called the "Great Chief of the West" in Piye's Victory stela and in two stelas dating to the regnal years 36 and 38 of Shoshenq V. It is uncertain if he ever adopted an official royal title. However, Olivier Perdu has now argued that a certain Shepsesre Tefnakhte of Sais was not, in fact, Piye's famous nemesis. Perdu published a recently discovered donation stela which came from a private collection; the document is dated to Year 2 of Necho I of Sais and is similar in style, epigraphy and text with the donation stela of Shepsesre. However, Perdu's arguments are not accepted by most Egyptologists at present, who believe that the Year 8 Shepsesre Tefnakht Athens stela was most likely Tefnakht I. The later king Tefnakht II, if he existed, would have been a close predecessor of Necho I. Both Tefnakht II and Necho I ruled as local Saite kings during the Nubian era under Taharqa.

=== Bakenranef ===
Tefnakht I's successor, Bakenranef, definitely assumed the throne of Sais and took the royal name Wahkare. His authority was recognised in much of the Delta including Memphis where several Year 5 and Year 6 Serapeum stelas from his reign have been found. This Dynasty came to a sudden end when Shebitqo, the second king of the Twenty-Fifth Dynasty, attacked Sais, captured Bakenrenef and burned him alive.

== Pharaohs ==
Name	Image	Reign	Throne name	Comments
Tefnakht I		732-725 BC	Shepsesre	He reigned for 3 years, he is known for his brutality.
Bakenranef		725-720 BC	Wahkare	Last king of egypt from 24th dynasty,Wahkare is known for his interest in religion and culture

== Family tree ==
Basa
Gemnefsutkapu
Tefnakht
Bakenranef	unnamed son	unnamed son

Preceded by Twenty-second Dynasty; Twenty-third Dynasty	Dynasties of Egypt c. 732 BC–720 BC	Succeeded by Twenty-fifth Dynasty
