= Necho I =

Ancient Egyptian ruler of the city of Sais, father of Psammetich I

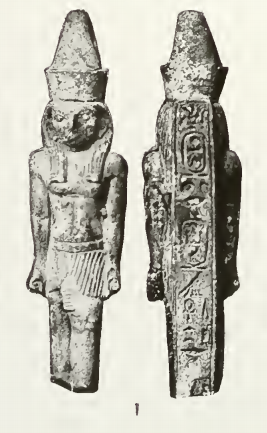
- Horus statuette bearing the cartouches of Necho I. London, Petrie Museum.

King of Sais
- Reign: 672–664 BCE
- Predecessor: Nekauba or Tefnakht II
- Successor: Psamtik I
Royal titulary
Prenomen
Menkheperre
Mn-ḫpr-Rˁ
Enduring is the apparition of Ra

M23 X1 L2 X1	ra mn xpr
Nomen
Nekau
N-kꜣw

G39 N5	n kA w
- Consort: Istemabet
- Children: Psamtik I, possibly Ta-khered-en-ta-ihet-[weret] and Meresamun
- Father: Tefnakht II
- Died: 664 BCE
- Dynasty: 26th Dynasty

Menkheperre Necho I (Egyptian: Nekau, Greek: Νεχώς Α' or Νεχώ Α', Akkadian: Nikuu or Nikû) (? – 664 BCE near Memphis) was a ruler of the ancient Egyptian city of Sais. He was the first securely attested local Saite king of the 26th Dynasty of Egypt who reigned for 8 years (672–664 BCE) according to Manetho's Aegyptiaca. Egypt was reunified by his son Psamtik I.

== Biography ==
In 672 BCE Necho became ruler of Sais, assuming the pharaonic titulary, and a year later the Assyrians led by Esarhaddon invaded Egypt. Necho became one of Esarhaddon's vassals, and the latter confirmed Necho's office and his possessions, as well as giving him new territories, possibly including the city of Memphis.

In 669 BCE, King Taharqa of the 25th Dynasty was advancing from the south toward the Nile Delta principalities which were formally under Assyrian control; Esarhaddon prepared himself to return to Egypt to repel the invader, but died suddenly. Esarhaddon's death led to a political crisis in the Neo-Assyrian Empire but at the end his son Ashurbanipal managed to become the new undisputed monarch. The counter-offensive planned by his father took place in 667–666 BCE.

Taharqa was defeated and driven back to Thebes, but Ashurbanipal found that the fleeing king and some of the rulers of Lower Egypt – named Pekrur of Pishaptu (Per-Sopdu), Sharruludari of Ṣinu (maybe Pelusium) and Nikuu (Necho I) – were plotting against him. The Assyrian king captured the conspirators, killed part of the population of the cities they governed, and deported the prisoners to Nineveh.

Unexpectedly, Necho was pardoned by the Assyrian king, and was reinstated at Sais with his previous possessions as well as many new territories as a gift, while his son Psamtik (called Nabusezibanni in Akkadian) was made mayor of Athribis. It has been suggested that with his magnanimity Ashurbanipal hoped to rely on the loyalty of an Egyptian ally in the event of another offensive led by the 25th Dynasty pharaohs, and perhaps to inspire and strengthen a rivalry between the two families (i.e., Kushites and Saites) because of shared interests. According to historical records, Necho I was slain in 664 BCE near Memphis while defending his realms from a new Kushite offensive led by Taharqa's successor Tantamani while Psamtik fled to Nineveh under Ashurbanipal's aegis. This Nubian invasion into the Egyptian Delta was subsequently (664–663 BCE) repelled by the Assyrians who proceeded to advance south into Upper Egypt and performed the infamous sack of Thebes.

With the Nile Delta secured once again, Psamtik I was appointed with his dead father's offices and territories. Later, he ultimately was successful in reuniting Egypt under his sole control.

=== Family ===
Danish Egyptologist Kim Ryholt made claims regarding Necho I: studying a papyrus from Tebtunis, he stated that Necho I was the son of a king named Tefnakht, presumably Tefnakht II. Ryholt also put in discussion the existence of Nekauba who was the purported predecessor of Necho I and possibly his brother; Ryholt suggested that the few, dubious documents regarding Nekauba should be attributed to the later Necho II instead, and that Necho I was the direct successor of Tefnakht II.

French historian Christian Settipani believes that Necho married Istemabet, and they were the parents of Psamtik I.

According to British Egyptologist Kenneth Kitchen, it is possible that princess Ta-khered-en-ta-ihet-[weret] was Necho's daughter, given in a politically arranged marriage to the local ruler of Herakleopolis, Pediese.

A now-lost limestone lintel from Luxor depicted a chantress of Amun named Meresamun along with a Saite form of Osiris and the Divine Adoratrice of Amun Shepenupet II; Meresamun is called "royal daughter of the lord of the Two lands, Nec[...]", the latter name written within a royal cartouche. It appears likely that Meresamun's royal father was no other than Necho I who sent his daughter to the Precinct of Amun-Re in Karnak, thus marking the beginning of the Saite influence in the city of Thebes.

== Attestations ==
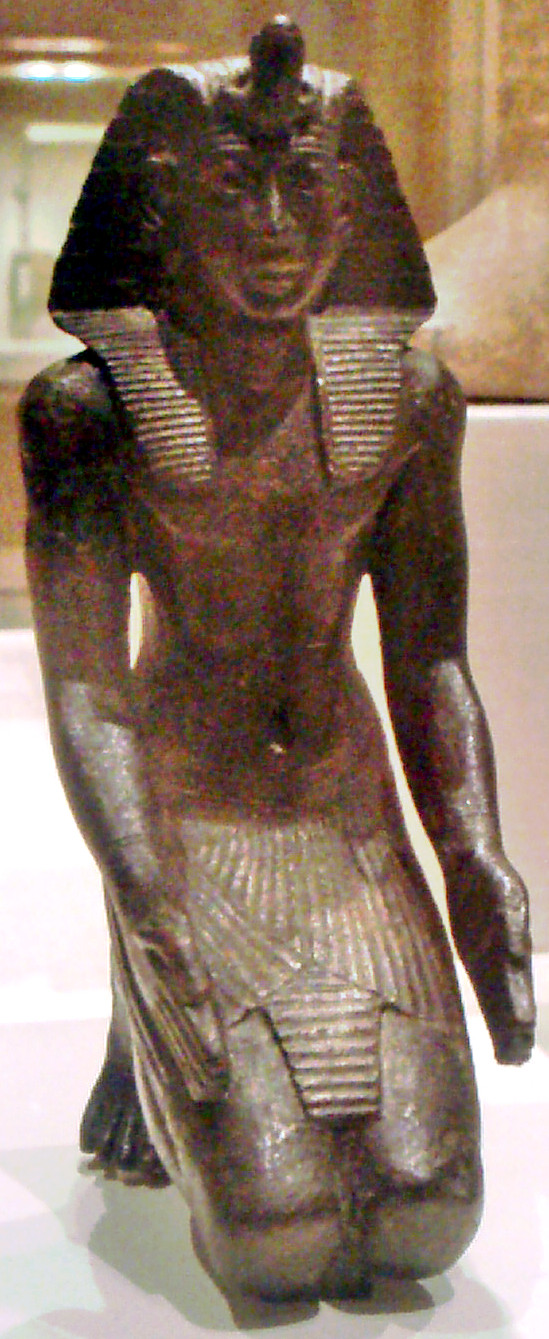
Kneeling statuette of a king Necho. It may depict either Necho I or II. Brooklyn Museum (acc.no. 71.11)

Necho I is primarily known from Assyrian documents but a few Egyptian objects are known too. A glazed pottery statuette of Horus which contains his cartouches and a dedication to the goddess Neith of Sais is now exhibited at the Petrie Museum of Egyptian Archaeology (UC 14869). The aforementioned, long–lost lintel of Meresamun was once photographed in an antiquities market at Luxor. A bronze kneeling statuette of a king Necho is housed at the Brooklyn Museum (acc.no. 71.11), but it is impossible to determine if it actually depicts Necho I or rather Necho II instead. He is also mentioned in several demotic stories.
Necho I's Year 2 is attested on a privately held donation stela that was first published by Olivier Perdu. The stela records a large land donation to the Osirian triad (Osiris, Isis, and Horus) of Per-Hebyt (modern Behbeit el-Hagar near Sebennytos) by the "priest of Isis Mistress of Hebyt, Great Chief... son of Iuput, Akanosh."

== Bibliography ==
- Coulon, Laurent; Payraudeau, Frédéric (2015). "Une princesse saïte à Thèbes sous la XXVe dynastie?". Revue d'Égyptologie. 66: 21–31.
- Kitchen, Kenneth (1996). The Third Intermediate Period in Egypt (1100–650 BC) (3rd ed.). Warminster: Aris & Phillips Limited. ISBN 0-85668-298-5.
- Lloyd, Alan B. (2001). "Necho I". In Redford, Donald B. (ed.). The Oxford Encyclopedia of Ancient Egypt, vol. II. Oxford: University Press.
- Perdu, Olivier (2002). "De Stéphinatès à Néchao ou les débuts de la XXVIe dynastie". CRAIBL (in French). 146 (4): 1215–1244. doi:10.3406/crai.2002.22514.
- Petrie, Flinders (1917). Scarabs and cylinders with names. London: University College Press.
- Picchi, Daniela (1997). Il conflitto tra Etiopi ed Assiri nell'Egitto della XXV dinastia [The war between Kushites and Assyrians in Egypt during the 25th Dynasty] (in Italian). Imola: La Mandragora. ISBN 88-86123-34-5.
- Ryholt, Kim (2004). "The Assyrian Invasion of Egypt in Egyptian Literary Tradition". In Dercksen, J.G. (ed.). Assyria and Beyond: Studies Presented to Mogens Trolle Larsen (in Dutch). Leiden: Nederlands Instituut voor het Nabije Oosten. pp. 483–510.
- Ryholt, Kim (2011a). "New light on the legendary King Nechepsos of Egypt". Journal of Egyptian Archaeology. 97: 61–72. doi:10.1177/030751331109700104. S2CID 190499542.
- Ryholt, Kim (2011b). "King Necho I son of king Tefnakhte II". In F. Feder; L. Morenz; G. Vittmann (eds.). Von Theben nach Giza. Festmiszellen für Stefan Grunert zum 65. Geburtstag. Göttinger Miszellen Beihefte (in German). Vol. 10. Göttingen.
- Settipani, Christian (1991). Nos ancêtres de l'Antiquité, Étude des possibilités de liens généalogiques entre les familles de l'Antiquité et celles du haut Moyen Âge européen [Our ancient ancestors: study into possible genealogical links between families in Antiquity and those in the Middle Ages of Europe] (in French). Paris. ISBN 2864960508.
- Spalinger, Anthony J. (2001). "Psamtik I". In Redford, Donald B. (ed.). The Oxford Encyclopedia of Ancient Egypt. Vol. III. Oxford: University Press. ISBN 978-0195102345.
- von Beckerath, Jürgen (1999). Handbuch der Ägyptischen Königsnamen. Münchner Ägyptologische Studien 49 (in German). Mainz: Philip von Zabern. ISBN 3-8053-2591-6.
