= Sais, Egypt =

Ancient Egyptian city

Sais
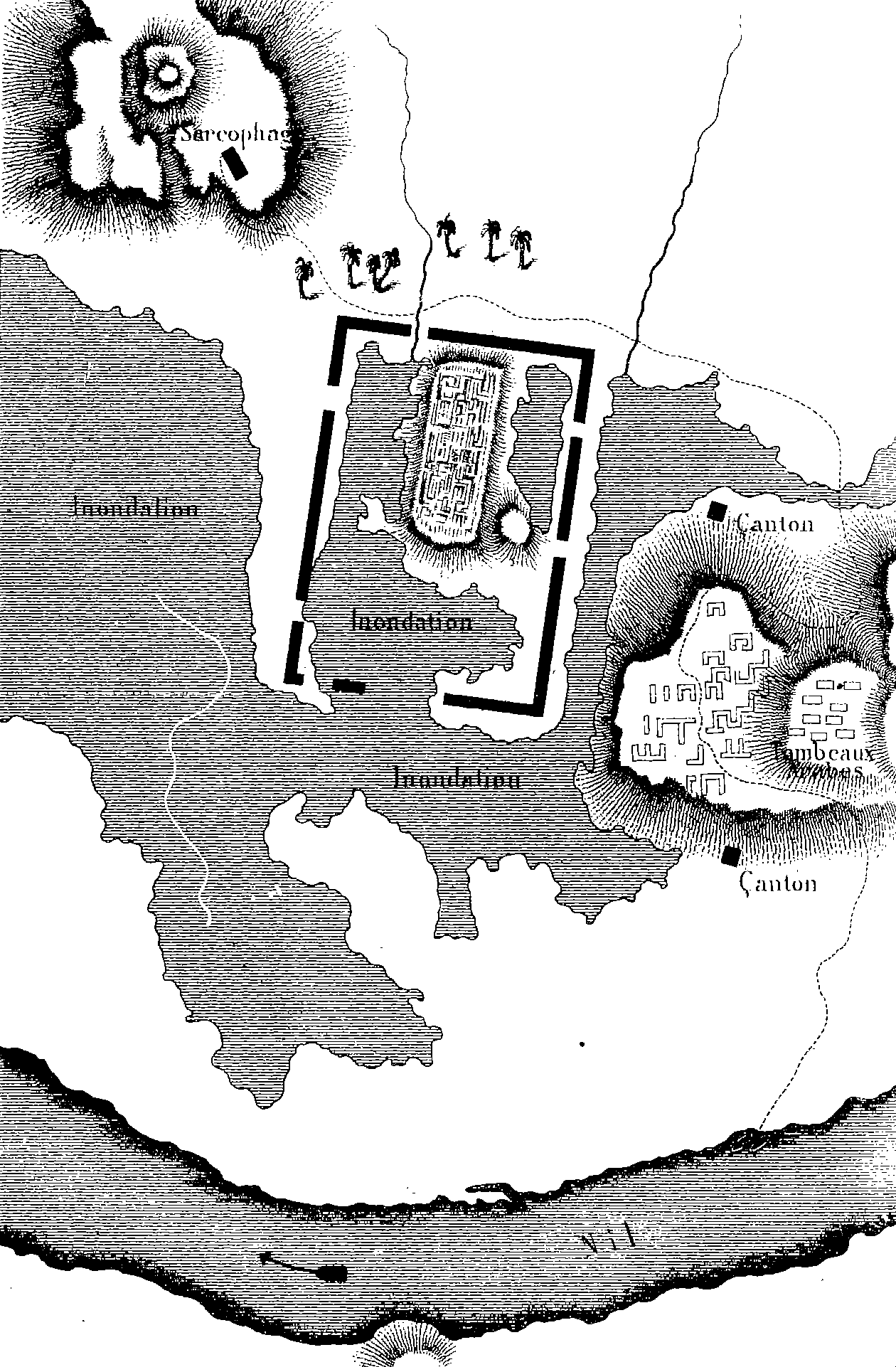
- Map of Sais ruins drawn by Jean-François Champollion during his expedition in 1828

- Location in Egypt
- Coordinates: 30°57′53″N 30°46′6″E
- Country: Egypt
- Governorate: Gharbia
- Time zone: UTC+2 (EST)

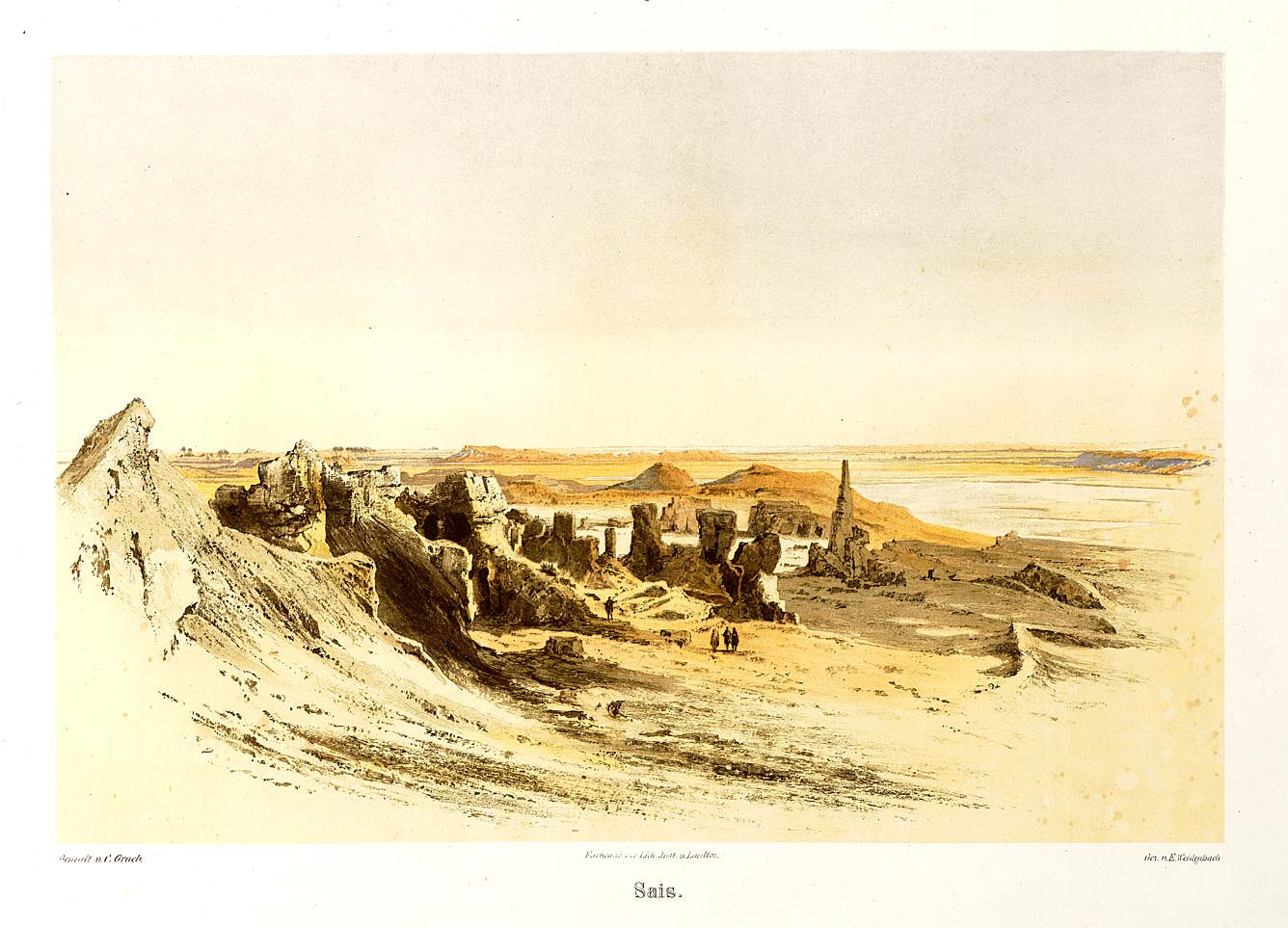
Ruins of Sais

Sais (Ancient Egyptian: 𓊃𓐰𓅭𓄿𓅱𓊖, romanized: Zꜣw; Ancient Greek: Σάϊς, romanized: Sáïs; Latin: Sais; Coptic: Ⲥⲁⲓ, romanized: Sai) was an ancient Egyptian city in the Western Nile Delta on the Canopic branch of the Nile, It was the provincial capital of Sap-Meh, the fifth nome of Lower Egypt and became the seat of power during the Twenty-fourth Dynasty of Egypt (c. 732–720 BC) and the Saite Twenty-sixth Dynasty of Egypt (664–525 BC) during the Late Period. On its ruins today stands the town of Sa el-Hagar (Egyptian Arabic: صا الحجر) or Sa El Hajar.

== Neolithic period ==
A Neolithic settlement has been identified at Sais recently (1999), dating to 5000 BC. Agriculture appears here during this period, as well as at another similar site, Merimde Beni Salama, which is located about 80km south of Sais.

The Neolithic period at Sais consists of three phases. The earliest phases are Early Neolithic (Sais I) and Late Neolithic (Sais II). During the Early Neolithic, the site started as a fishing camp but later, in the Middle to Late Neolithic Period, it was settled by agriculturalists for the cultivation of the floodplain.

The evolution of activity from fish processing to a settled hunting and agricultural phase may be connected to gradual changes in climatic conditions from 4600 BC onwards. It is believed that the Middle Holocene Moist phase started at that time.

== Antiquity ==
Herodotus wrote that Sais is where the grave of Osiris was located and that the sufferings of the god were displayed as a mystery by night on an adjacent lake.

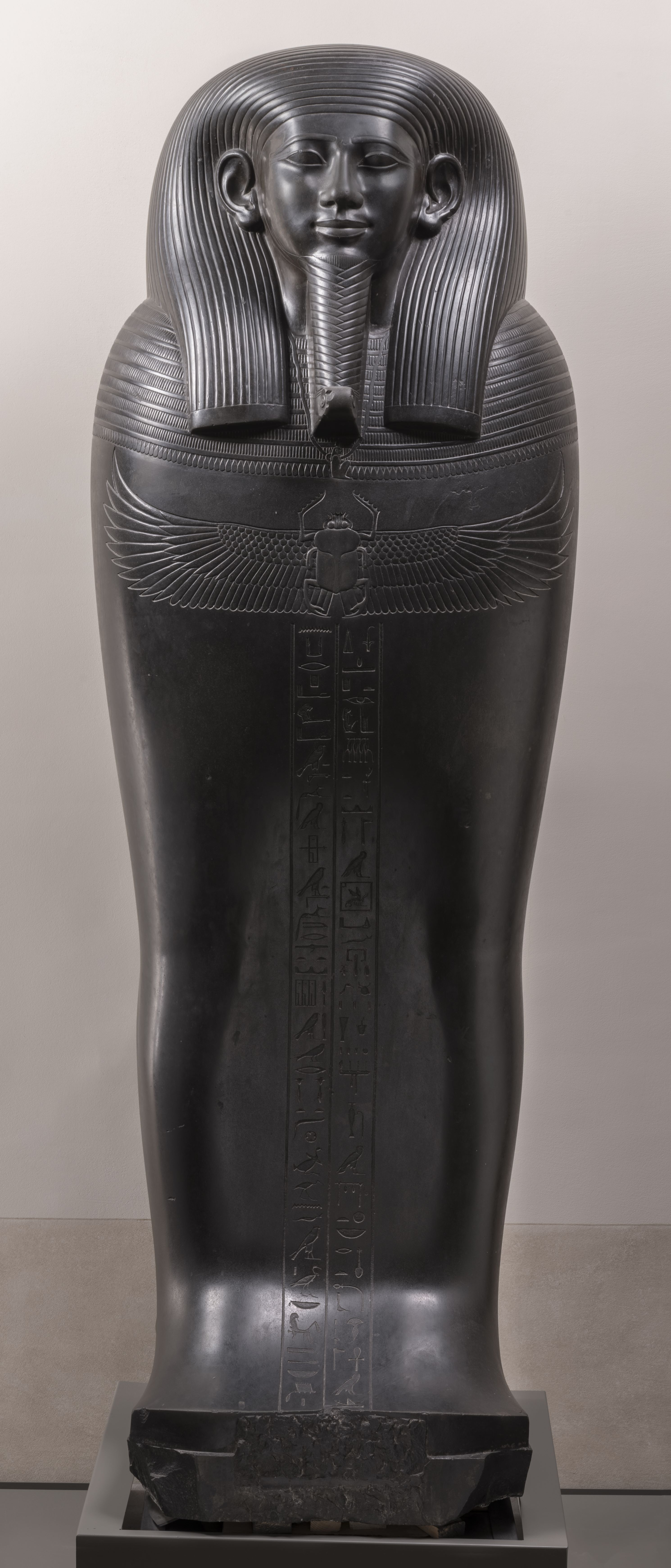
Lid of the sarcophagus of the Vizier Gemenefhorbak, from Sais. Museo Egizio, Turin (C 2201 01).

The city's patron goddess was Neith, whose cult is attested as early as the First Dynasty of Egypt (c. 3100–3050 BC). The Greeks, such as Herodotus, Plato, and Diodorus Siculus, identified her with Athena and hence postulated a primordial link to Athens. Diodorus recounts that Athenians built Sais before the deluge. While all Greek cities were destroyed during that cataclysm, including Athens, Sais and the others Egyptian cities survived.

There are today no surviving traces of this town prior to the Late New Kingdom (c. 1100 BC) due to the extensive destruction of the city by the sebakhin (farmers removing mudbrick deposits for use as fertilizer) leaving only a few relief blocks in situ.

Though the proposed Sa El Hagar site has little evidence of this city, obelisks in Piazza della Minerva and Urbino in Italy are claimed to originate from Sais.

During the Islamic conquest of Egypt, a battle was fought at Sais between the Rashidun Caliphate and the Byzantine Empire, according to John of Nikiû. It remained a pagarchy and Christian bishopric at least through the early 700s. Medieval writers like Yaqut al-Hamawi, al-Maqrizi, and al-Qalqashandi attributed the city's foundation to one "Sā ibn Misr"; Ibn Iyas called the founder "Sā ibn Marqunus". The site was used as a stone quarry during this period. By the time of Ibn Iyas, the city had fallen almost completely into ruin.

The 1885 Census of Egypt recorded Sa el-Hagar as a nahiyah under the district of Kafr az-Zayyat in Gharbia Governorate; at that time, the population of the town was 4,474 (2,250 men and 2,224 women).

=== Medical school ===
The Temple of Sais had a medical school associated with it, as did many ancient Egyptian temples. The medical school at Sais had many female students and apparently women faculty as well, mainly in gynecology and obstetrics. An inscription from the period survives at Sais, and reads, "I have come from the school of medicine at Heliopolis, and have studied at the woman's school at Sais, where the divine mothers have taught me how to cure diseases".

== Cultural depictions ==
Plato's Timaeus and Critias (around 395 BC, 200 years after the visit by the Greek legislator Solon) identifies Sais as the city in which Solon receives from an Egyptian priest the story of Atlantis, its military aggression against Greece and Egypt, and its eventual defeat and destruction. Solon visited Egypt in 590 BC. Plato also notes the city as the birthplace of the pharaoh Amasis II (r. 570 BC – 526 BC).

Plutarch states that the shrine of Athena (whom he identifies with Isis) in Sais carried the inscription "I am all that hath been, and is, and shall be; and my veil no mortal has hitherto raised." The image of the Veil of Isis appeared repeatedly in Western culture.

Hector Berlioz' L'enfance du Christ ("The Childhood of Christ"), in part Three, has Sais as the setting for the youth of Jesus until age 10, after his family leaves Palestine to escape Herod's Massacre of the Innocents.

The video game Assassin's Creed Origins depicts Sais as under the control of "The Scarab", a member of the Order of the Ancients.

== See also ==
- List of ancient Egyptian towns and cities
- List of historical capitals of Egypt
- Apries
- Sonchis of Sais
- Elephant and Obelisk
- Urbino Obelisk

| Preceded by Tanis | Historical capital of Egypt; 732 – 720 BC | Succeeded by Napata/Memphis |
| Preceded by Napata/Memphis | Historical capital of Egypt; 664 – 525 BC | Succeeded by Persepolis (Achaemenid Empire) |
| Preceded by Babylon (Achaemenid Empire) | Historical capital of Egypt; 404 – 399 BC | Succeeded by Mendes |
