= Claire Lalouette =

French egyptologist (1921–2010)

- Scientific career
- Fields: Archaeology and Egyptology

Claire Lalouette is a French Egyptologist, former scientific member of the Institut Français d'Archéologie Orientale in Cairo, Egypt, and Professor at Paris-Sorbonne University.

Her works have been translated into Arabic, Spanish, Portuguese, and Romanian, most notably the monumental four-volume History of Pharaonic Civilisation.

== Bibliography ==
- Fidèles du soleil, à propos de la statuette du musée de Brooklyn, 37, 48 E, Faculté des lettres et sciences humaines, Paris, 1963.
- La Littérature égyptienne, n°1934, coll. Que sais-je ?, PUF, Paris, 1981.
- Textes sacrés et textes profanes de l'ancienne Égypte. Tome 1 : Des pharaons et des hommes, préface de Pierre Grimal, Gallimard, Paris, 1984 ISBN 2070701425
- Histoire de la civilisation pharaonique. Tome 1 : Au royaume d'Égypte. Le temps des rois-dieux, Fayard, Paris, 1991; réédition Flammarion, 1995 ISBN 2080813293
- Histoire de la civilisation pharaonique. Tome 2 : Thèbes, ou la naissance d'un empire, Fayard, Paris, 1986; réédition Flammarion, 1995 ISBN 2080813285
- Histoire de la civilisation pharaonique. Tome 3 : L’Empire des Ramsès, Fayard, Paris, 1985; réédition Flammarion, 1995 ISBN 2080813293
- Textes sacrés et textes profanes de l'ancienne Égypte. Tome 2: Mythes, contes et poésie, Gallimard, Paris, 1987 ISBN 2070711765
- L'Art de la vie dans l'Égypte pharaonique, Fayard, Paris, 1992 ISBN 2213029202
- Mémoires de Ramsès le Grand, Éditions de Fallois, Paris, 1993 ISBN 2877061841
- Contes et récits de l'Égypte ancienne, Flammarion, Paris, 1995.
- L'Art figuratif de l'Égypte pharaonique, Flammarion, Paris, 1996 ISBN 2080813269
- Les Hommes illustres du temps des pharaons, Flammarion, Paris, 1996 ISBN 2082100251
- Mémoires de Thutmose III, Calmann-Lévy, Paris, 1997 ISBN 2702127142
- La Littérature égyptienne, PUF, Paris, 1997 ISBN 2130369715
- Sagesse sémitique. De l'Égypte ancienne à l'Islam, Albin Michel, Paris, 1998 ISBN 2226096108
- Le Monde des Ramsès, Bayard, Paris, 2002 ISBN 2227139439
- Contes et récits de l'Égypte ancienne, Flammarion, Paris, 2003 ISBN 2080800647
- Dieux et pharaons de l'Égypte ancienne, J'ai lu, 2004 ISBN 2-290-34034-0 BnF 39272165r
