= Hymn to the Nile =

Ancient Egyptian song

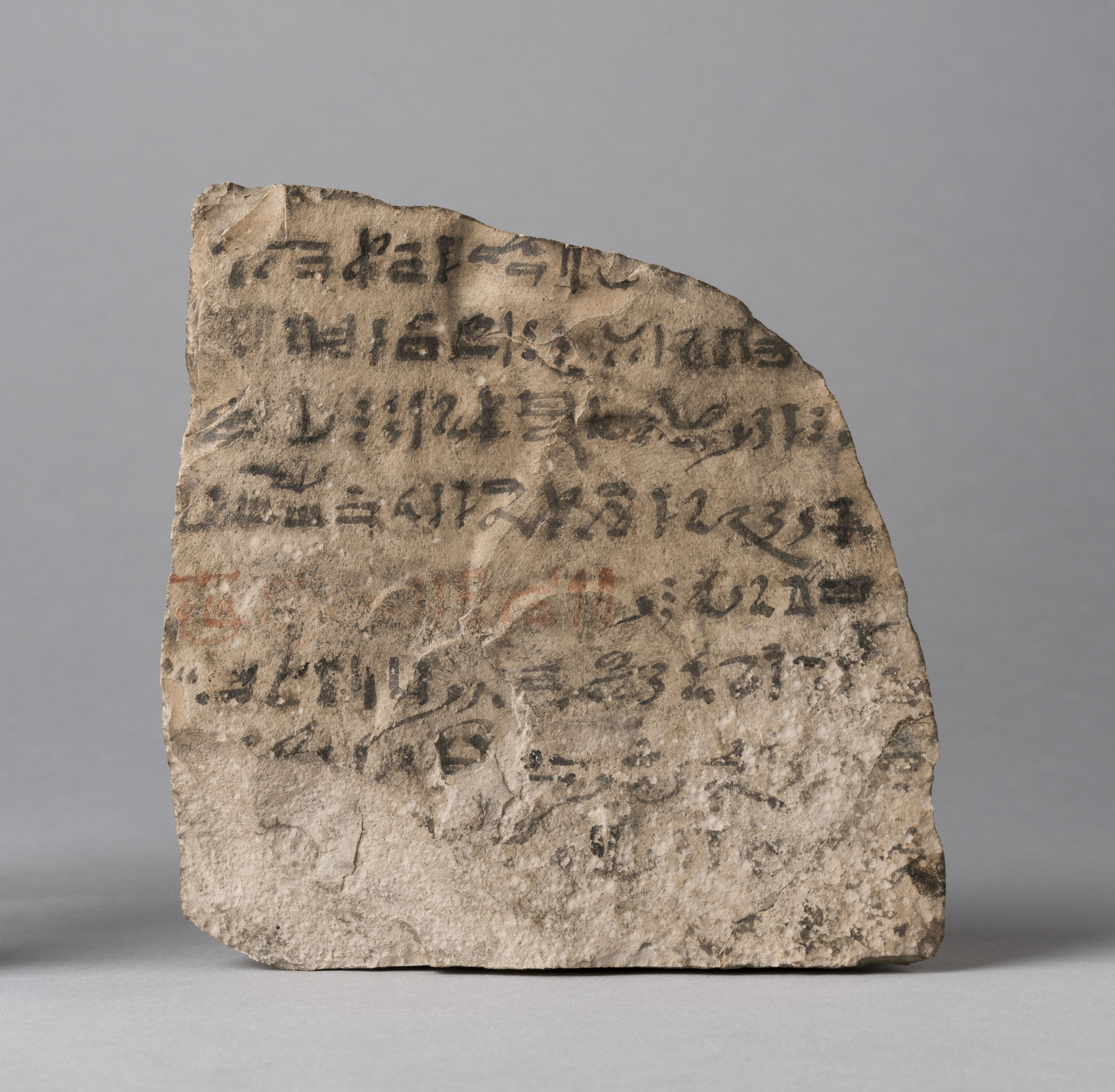
Hieratic ostracon inscribed with part of the Hymn to the Nile, limestone. Museo Egizio, Turin (S. 6356)

"Hymn to the Nile" (or "Hymn to Hapy") is a tune that was created and sung by the ancient Egyptian peoples about the flooding of the Nile. Herodotus called Egypt the "Gift of the Nile" because ancient Egyptian civilization shaped its culture around and depended on resources from the river.

== Analysis ==
=== Religion ===
The ancient Egyptian peoples believed the Nile river was a god. The hymn specifically states "offerings are made unto you, men are immolated to you, great festivals are instituted for you. Birds are sacrificed to you, gazelles are taken for you in the mountain, pure flames are prepared for you."

=== Agriculture ===
The ancient Egyptian peoples depended on the fertile valleys by the river for agriculture. There are many quotes in the hymn showcasing their gratitude for the Nile River supporting their crop growth. For example: "Lord of the fish, during the inundation, no bird alights on the crops. You create the grain, you bring forth the barley, assuring perpetuity to the temples."
