= Karomama I =

Egyptian queen

Karomama
- Queen consort of Egypt; Great Royal Wife; Lady of The Two Lands; Mistress of Upper and Lower Egypt, etc
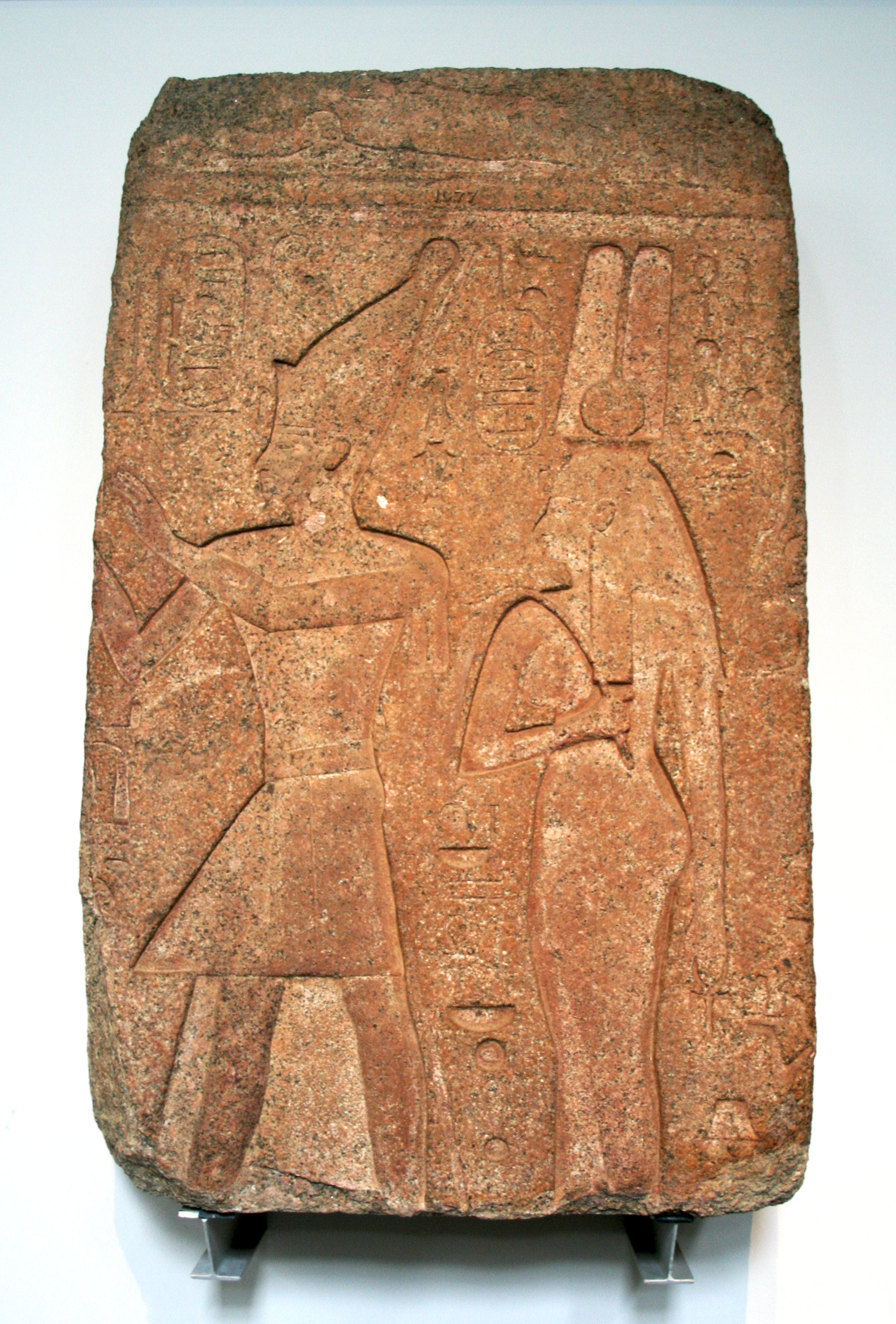
- Stele depicting Osorkon II and Karomama
- Spouse: Pharaoh Osorkon II
- Issue: Shoshenq D Hornakht; Tashakheper; Karomama C, [Ta?]iirmer

< kA Z1 r r a M Z1 a >
Karomama
in hieroglyphs
Era: 1st Intermediate Period
(2181–2055 BC)

Karomama I was an Egyptian queen, married to Osorkon II. She was part of the Twenty-second Dynasty of Egypt.

== Family ==
Karomama was likely a daughter of Pharaoh Takelot I. She was one of three known wives of Osorkon II. The other wives being Isetemkheb G and Djedmutesankh IV.

Karomama was the mother of at least two sons and three daughters:

- Prince Shoshenq D, was High Priest of Ptah
- Prince Hornakht was the High Priest of Amun in Tanis. He was buried in his father's tomb at Tanis, having died at the age of 8 or 9 years old.
- Princess Tashakheper may have served as God's Wife of Amun during the reign of Takelot III
- Princess Karomama C, who may be identical to Karomama Meritmut, a God's Wife of Amun
- Princess [Ta?]iirmer

== Biography ==
Osorkon II had many buildings raised during his reign, including a detailed monumental red granite hall in the 22nd year of his reign. Relief images of him and Queen Karomama decorate the walls. Queen Karomama (also known as Karomama B) was also a Royal daughter, but it is unclear which king was her father. As she is not titled Royal Sister, one can assume she was not Takelot I's daughter, but the lack of the title King's Sister is not conclusive. Other candidates are Shoshenq II or Harsiese. In the Jubilee reliefs, she is accompanied by her three daughters Tashakheper A, Karomama C and [Ta?]iirmer (Year 22).
