= Isetemkheb D =

Isetemkheb
- Chief of the Harem of Amun-Re
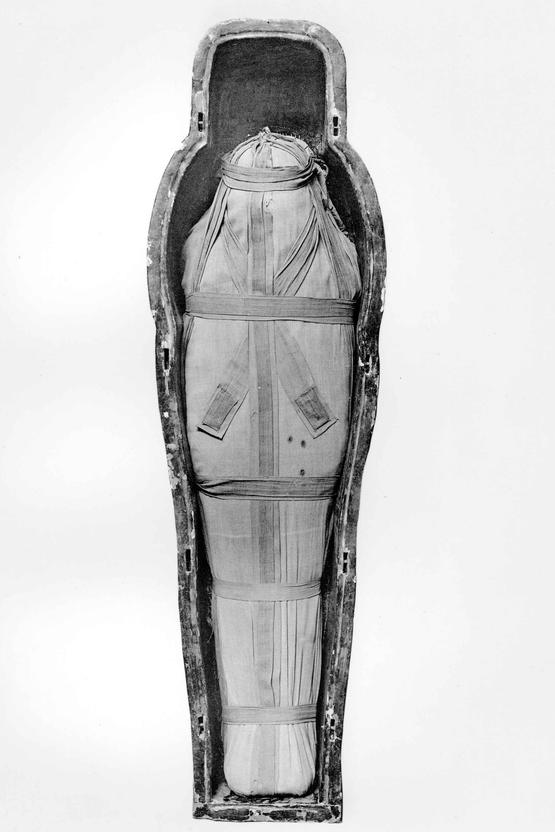
- Mummy of Isetemkheb D found in DB320
- Dynasty: 21st Dynasty of Egypt
- Died: Thebes?
- Burial: TT320 in Thebes
- Spouse: Pinudjem II
- Father: Menkheperre
- Mother: Isetemkheb C
- Children: Psusennes II; Herwebenkhet; Hennutawy; Maatkare

Isetemkheb D was the sister-wife of the Theban High Priest of Amun Pinedjem II during the Twenty-first Dynasty of Egypt.

== Family ==
Isetemkheb D was the daughter of the King's Son, Theban High Priest of Amun and General, Menkheperre, and his wife, Isetemkheb C. Isetemkheb D married her brother Pinedjem II.

Isetemkheb and Pinedjem II are thought to have had four children:

- Theban High Priest of Amun and Pharaoh Psusennes II (Pasebakhaenniut II),
- Lady Herwebenkhet, who was a Chief of the Harem of Amen-Re
- God's Wife of Amun Hennutawy
- Lady of the House and Chantress Maatkare.

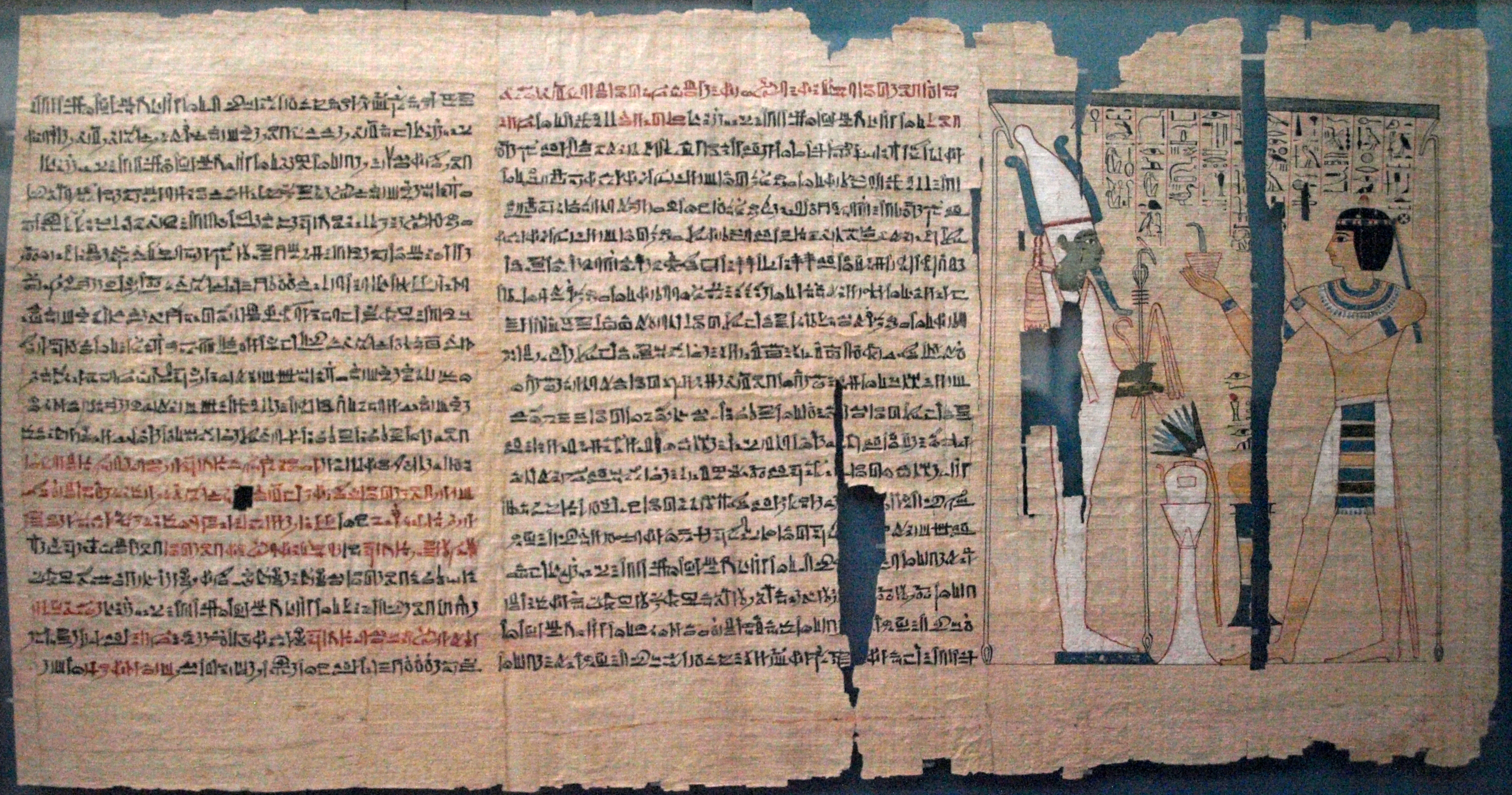
Pinedjem II as depicted on his Book of the Dead

== Burial ==
Isetemkheb's mummy and coffins were found in the royal cache found in TT320 in Deir el-Bahari in Thebes. Istemkheb's mummy was never unwrapped.
