= Statue of Karomama, the Divine Adoratrice of Amun =

Ancient Egyptian bronze statue

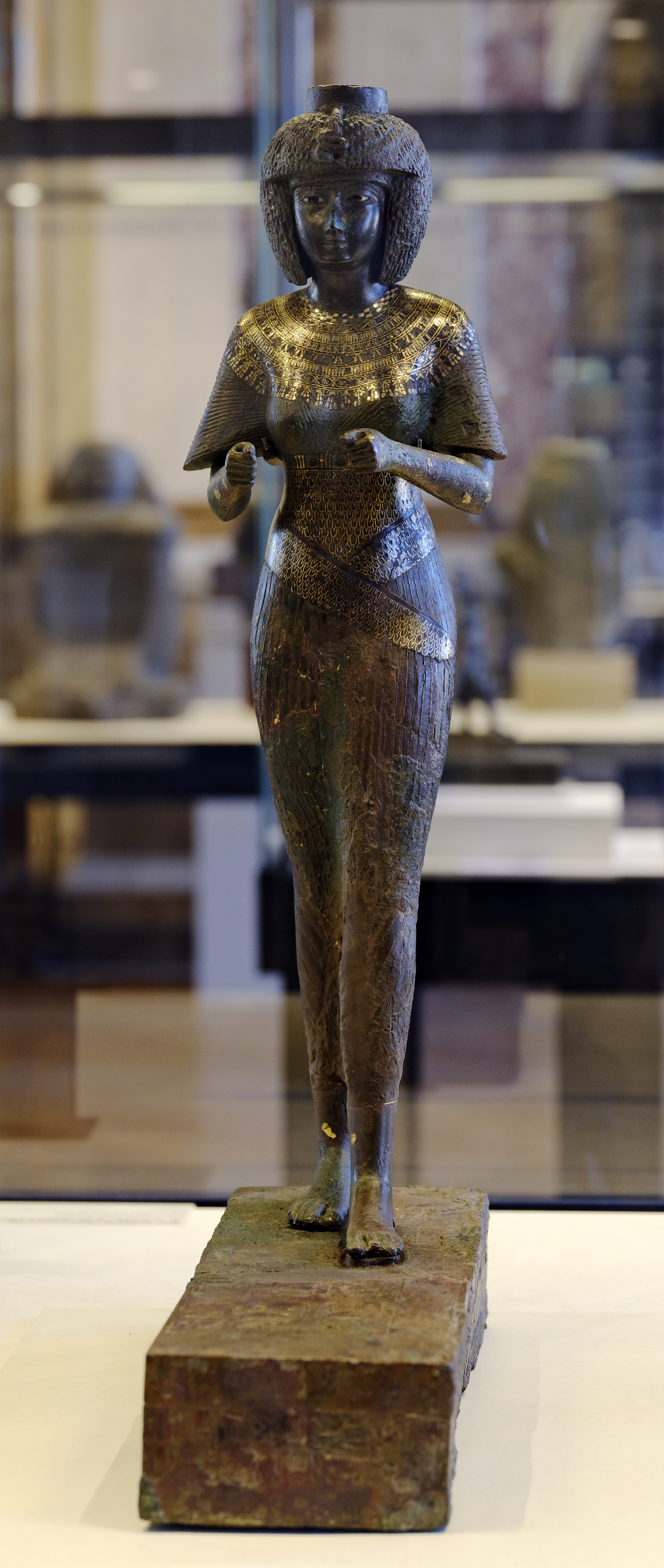
- Year: c. 850 BCE (Julian)
- Medium: bronze, gold, silver, electrum
- Dimensions: 59 cm (23 in) × 15.5 cm (6.1 in) × 35.2 cm (13.9 in)
- Location: Room 643
- Collection: Department of Egyptian Antiquities of the Louvre
- Accession no.: N 500

The Statue of Karomama, the Divine Adoratrice of Amun is a bronze statue depicting a priestess of Amun during the 22nd Dynasty of Egypt, circa 870 BCE. It was discovered in Karnak, and is now on display at the Musée du Louvre.

Jean-François Champollion acquired the statue in 1829, and misidentified the subject as Karomama II, wife and sister of Pharoh Takelot II; the Karomama depicted is in fact a daughter of Osorkon I, Karomama Meritmut.

The statue is made of bronze, with gold, silver and electrum damascening inlay. The overseer of the treasury Ahentefnakht offered it to her.

== Source ==
- Gabrielle Bartz et Eberhard König, Le Musée du Louvre, éditions Place des Victoires, Paris, 2005, ISBN 3-8331-2089-4, p. 136.
- Benoît Lurson (dir.) (2017). De la mère du roi à l'épouse du dieu. Première synthèse des résultats des fouilles du temple de Touy et de la tombe de Karomama. Connaissance de l'Égypte ancienne. Bruxelles: Safran (éditions). ISBN 978-2-87457-097-1.
