= Karomama Meritmut =

- God's Wife of Amun
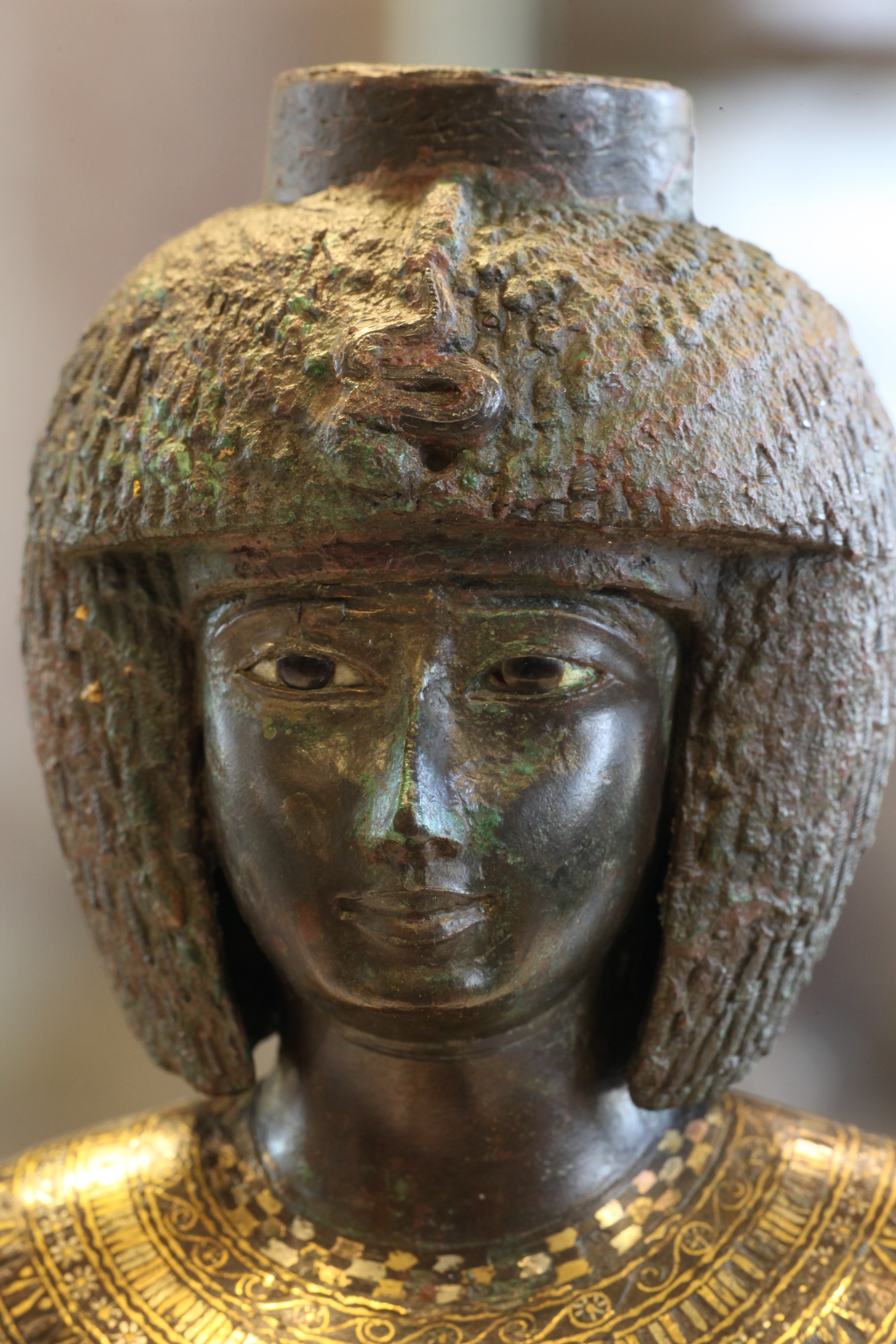
- Statuette of Karomama Meritmut at the Louvre (N 500)
Egyptian name
Royal titulary
Prenomen
Sitamun Mutemhat
Nomen
< mwt t mr kA r Z1 M a M a >
Karomama Meritmut
short form
< kA Z1 r r a M Z1 a >
Karomama
- Predecessor: Henuttawy
- Successor: Shepenupet I
- Dynasty: 22nd Dynasty
- Burial: Shaft tomb in the Ramesseum
- Father: possibly Osorkon II

Karomama Meritmut (prenomen: Sitamun Mutemhat) was an ancient Egyptian high priestess, a God's Wife of Amun during the 22nd Dynasty.

She is possibly identical with Karomama, a daughter of Pharaoh Osorkon II, who was depicted in the sed-hall of the pharaoh. She followed Henuttawy as high priestess. She is depicted in the Karnak chapel Osiris-Nebankh ("Osiris, Lord of Life"). A bronze statue of hers, Statue of Karomama, the Divine Adoratrice of Amun (N 500), which she received from her overseer of the treasury Ahentefnakht, is now on display at the Louvre; a votive statue of Maat she also received from him, was found in Karnak, a stela of hers, her canopic jars and ushabtis are in Berlin. She was followed as God's Wife by Shepenupet I. Her tomb was found in December 2014 in the area of the Ramesseum at Thebes.
