= Herwebenkhet =

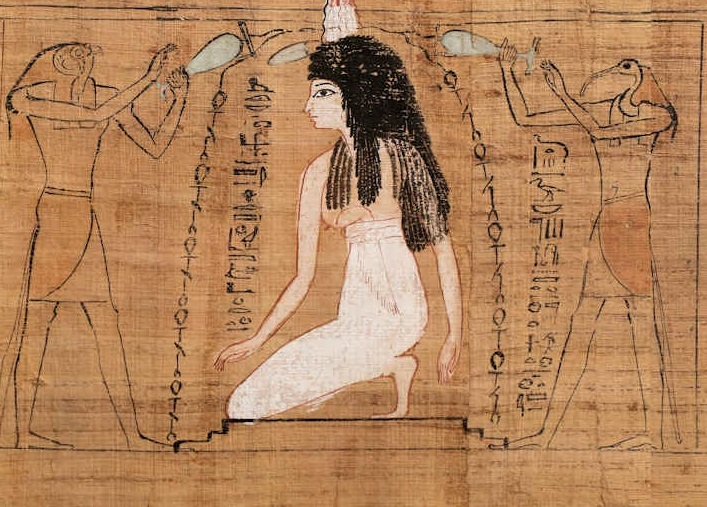
- Her-weben-khet purified by Re-Horakhty and Thoth
- Burial place: Bab el-Gasus
- Known for: Her Book of dead
- Title: Chantress of Amun
- Parents: Pinedjem II (father); Isetemkheb D (mother)

Herwebenkhet, also known as Heroubekht, Herouben, Harweben, and Herytuben, was chantress of Amun and a daughter of the high priest and de facto ruler of Upper Egypt Pinedjem II and his wife Isetemkheb D.

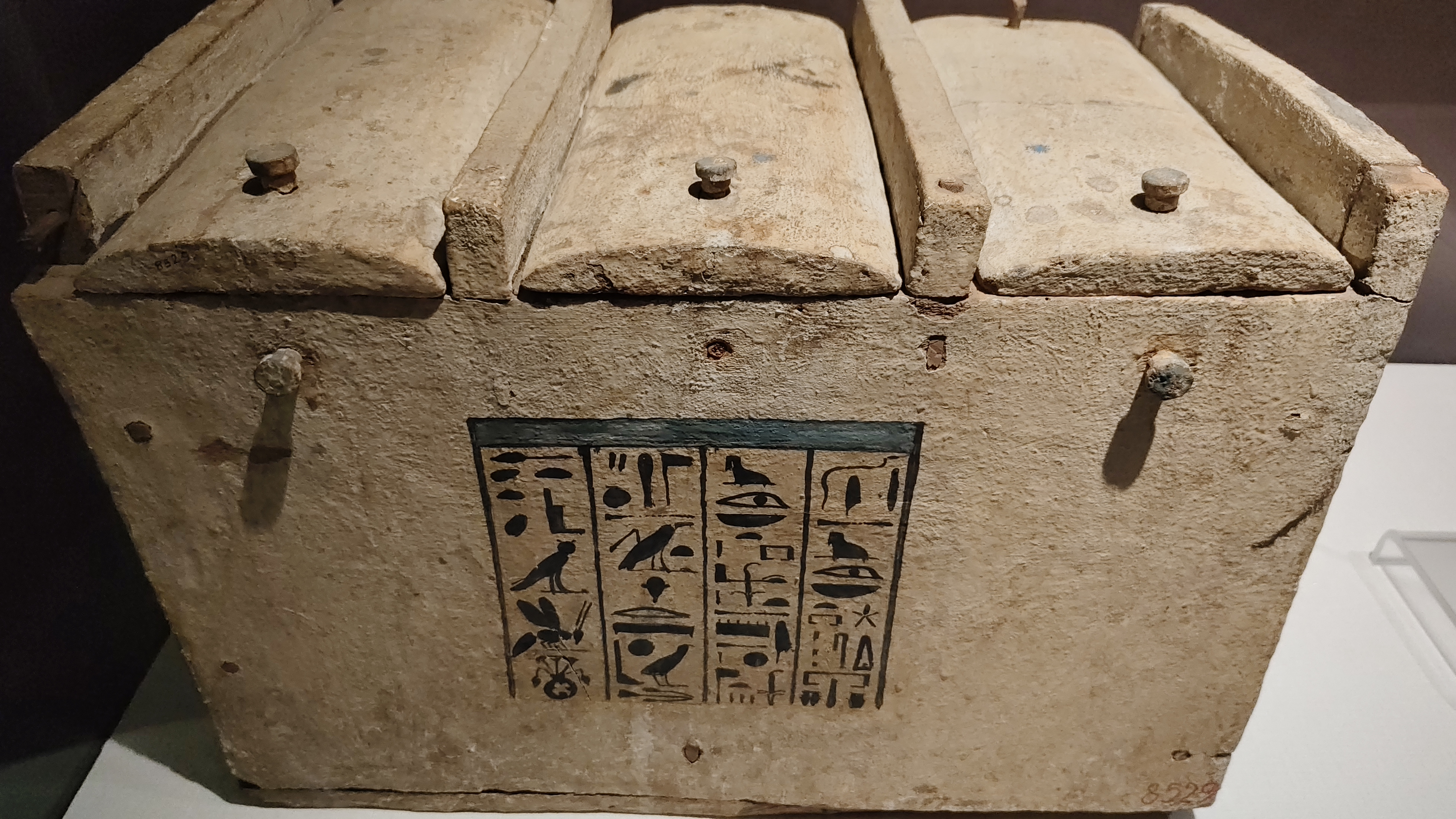
Shabti Box of Herytubekhet

== Book of dead ==
This papyrus is intended to be a part of her own abbreviated version of the Book of the Dead. It contains a set of spells to guide her through the underworld.

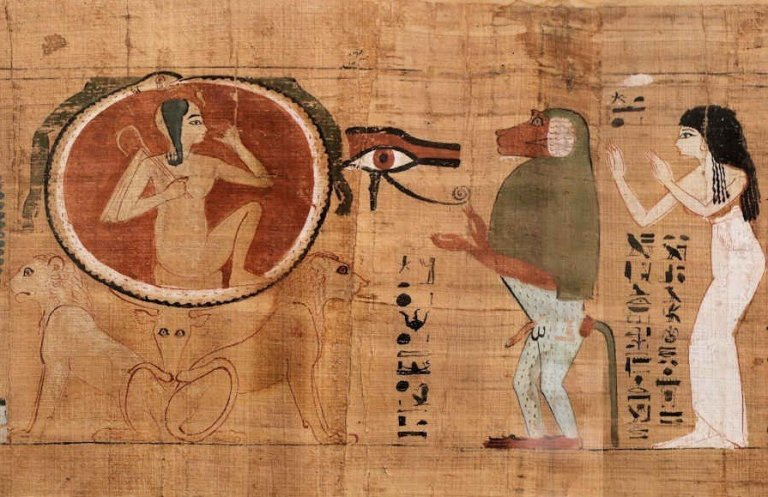
Harpocrates or Horus the Child depicted within the sun disc, resting upon the Aker lions and surrounded by an Ouroboros

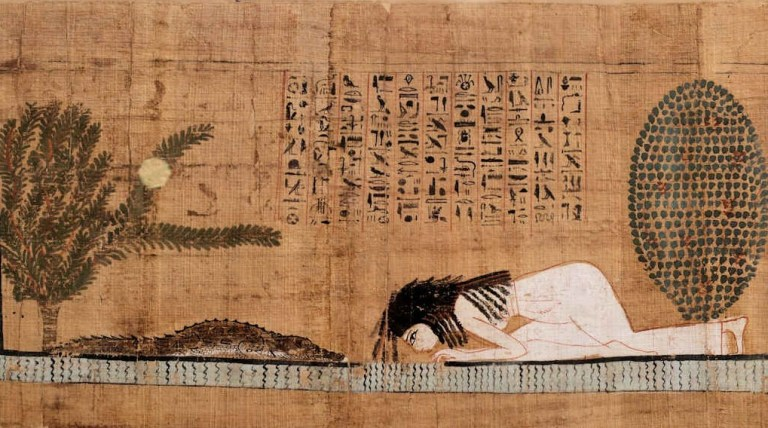
Her-weben-khet drinks from the water before the god Geb as a crocodile

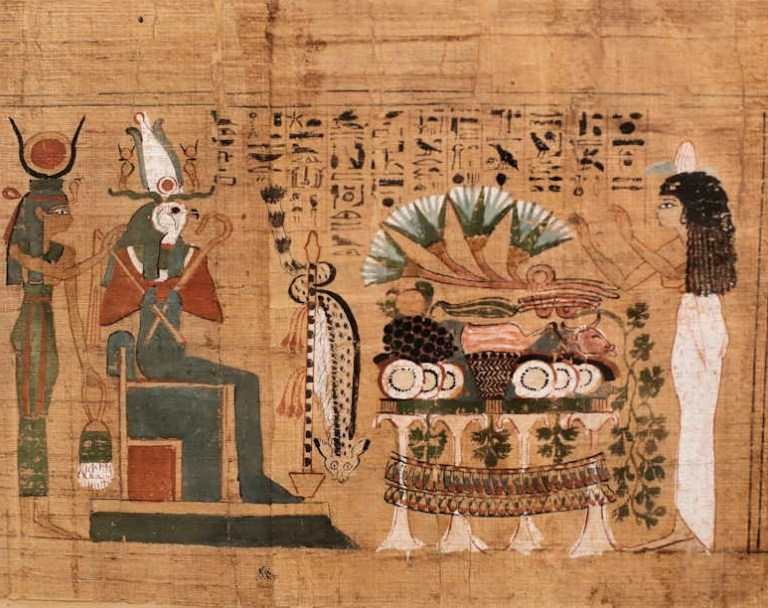
Her-weben-khet presents offerings to Ptah-Sokar in his form as Osiris.

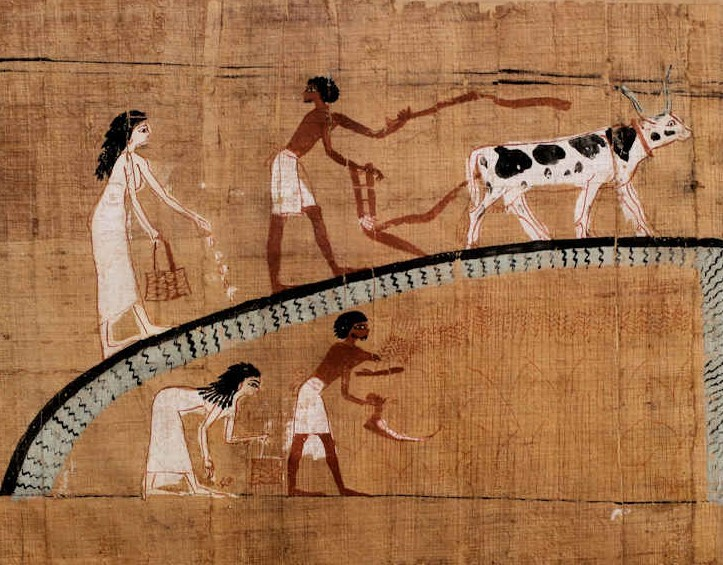
Her-weben-khet sowing seed and gathering the harvest
