= Henuttawy (priestess) =

Henuttawy D
- God's Wife of Amun; Adoratrice of Amun
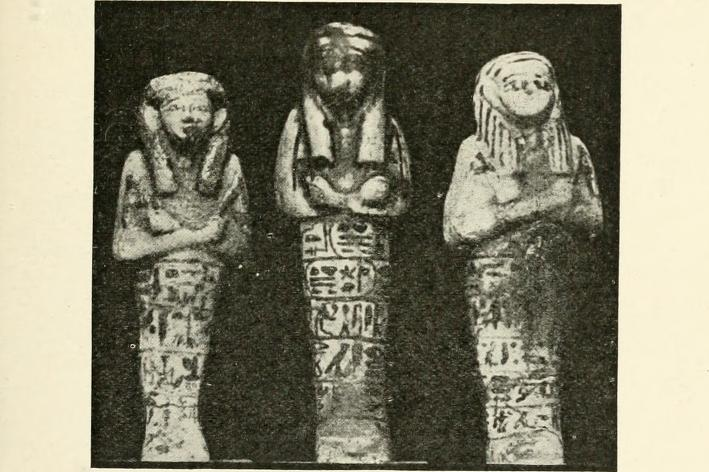
- An ushabti of Henuttawy D (center), now at the Petrie Museum
Egyptian name
W10 t N17 N17
- Dynasty: 21st Dynasty
- Died: Thebes?
- Father: Pinedjem II
- Mother: Isetemkheb D

Henuttawy D was an ancient Egyptian high priestess, a God's Wife of Amun, during the 21st Dynasty.

== Biography ==
Her father was Pinedjem II, High Priest of Amun, her mother was Isetemkheb D, Singer of Amun. Both her parents were children of the high priest Menkheperre who was brother to Maatkare Mutemhat, the God's Wife preceding Henuttawy.

Henuttawy is known only from a few ushabtis. She was followed as God's Wife by Karomama Meritmut.

Preceded by Maatkare Mutemhat	God's Wife of Amun; 21st Dynasty	Succeeded by Karomama Meritmut
