= Hornakht =

Ancient Egyptian prince, High Priest of Amun at Tanis

- Prince
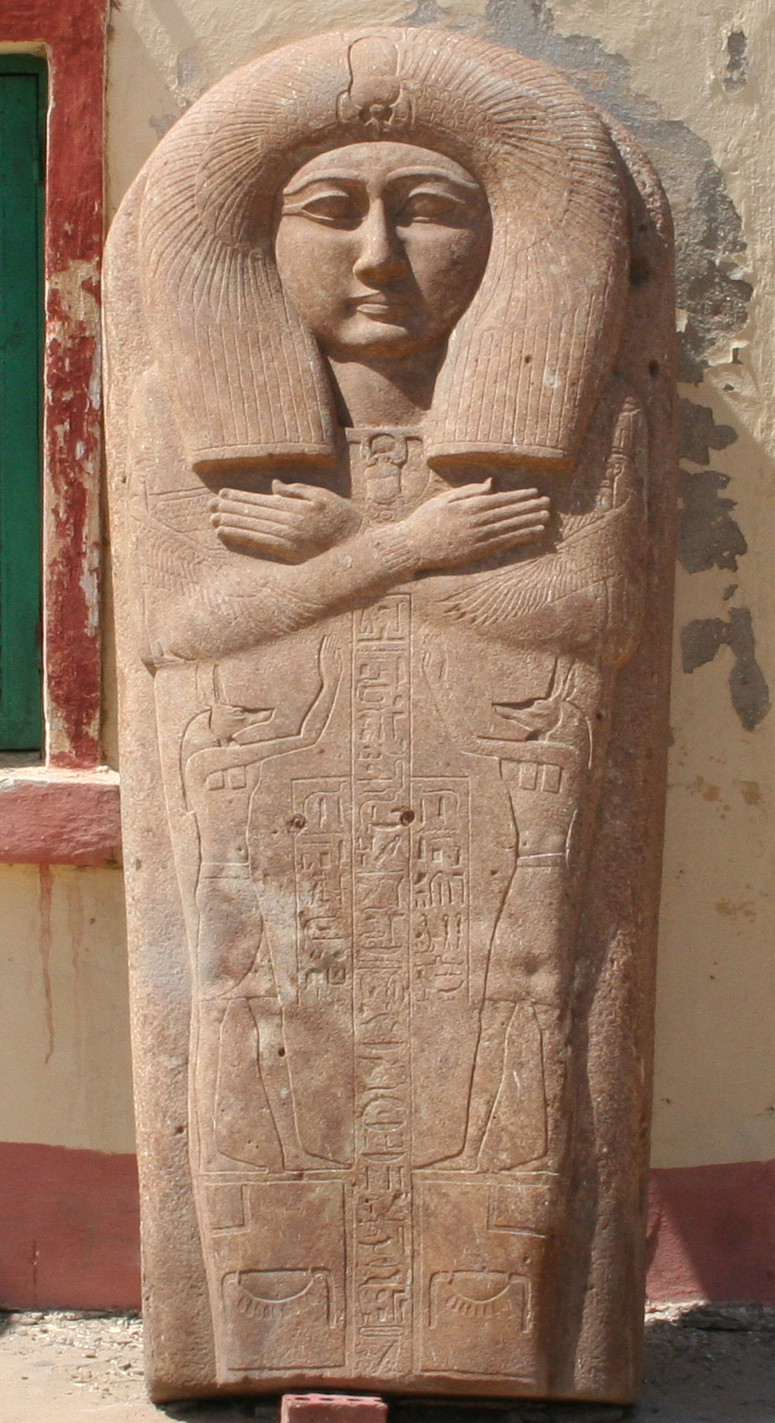
- The sarcophagus lid of Hornakht
- Dynasty: 22nd Dynasty
- Pharaoh: Osorkon II
- Burial: Tanis, NRT I
- Father: Osorkon II
- Mother: Karomama I

Prince Hornakht (or Harnakht) was the son of pharaoh Osorkon II of the 22nd Dynasty. He was appointed by Osorkon II to the office of chief priest of Amun at Tanis to strengthen this king's authority in Lower Egypt. However, this was primarily a political move on Osorkon II's part since Hornakht died before the age of 10.

When Hornakht died at this young age, Osorkon II made provisions to ensure that his son would be buried in this king's own tomb at Tanis. While tomb robbers managed to penetrate the burial of Hornakht in antiquity, his sarcophagus still preserved parts of the tomb treasures which were once placed upon the prince's mummy since a large granite block placed over Hornakht's burial prevented them from lifting its lid completely. Secondly, most of the grave robbers attention were focused upon the sarcophagus of Osorkon II which would have featured this king's vastly more splendid treasures.

The grave robbers succeeded in removing the gold funerary mask which covered Hornakht's face as well as some ornaments which adorned his neck; however, they abandoned their efforts to steal the remainder of the prince's funerary treasures. Therefore, when Egyptologist Pierre Montet discovered the burial of Hornakht, they found a series of gold amulets which covered parts of the prince's mummy. They are small in size but enjoy a high quality finish; some are made of gold partitioned lapis lazuli and other semi-precious stones which represent various mythical symbols intended to safeguard the sanctity of Hornakht's mummified body.

According to the analysis of his skeleton performed in 1942 by Dr. Douglas Derry, Hornakht died aged 8–9. On the remains some peculiarities were noted, such as an unusually large and developed skull for his age, the presence of a pair of cervical ribs, and an abnormal lumbar vertebra; however, Derry excluded that these anomalies may have led to Hornakht's premature death. Part of the face was damaged by embalmers during the brain removal by the nose.

A block statue from the Serapeum at Saqqara may well have been dedicated to Hornakht. The statue is decorated with relief images of queen Karomama I, Hornakht’s mother, and of the god Amun-Ra (besides other divinities). The sculpture now has a figure of Osiris at the front (re-cut from what appears to have represented a naos once) and was probably set up not long after the prince’s premature death.
