= Shoshenq D =

Egyptian High Priest of Ptah

Shoshenq
- High Priest of Ptah in Memphis
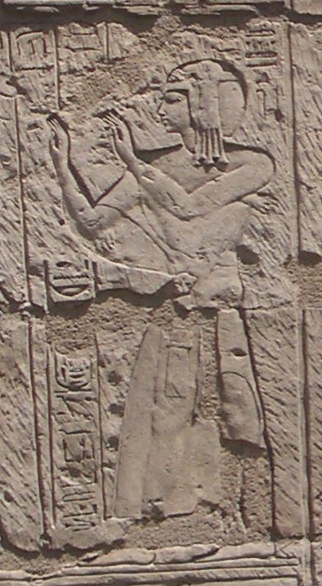
- Relief representing the High Priest of Ptah Shoshenq.
Egyptian name
D21 Q3 D36 G36 r x r p D40 Z3 U24 w t A1 Z3 M8 M8 n q A1The Prince, The Greatest of the Directors of the Craftsmen, Shoshenq
jry-p‘t wr ḫrp ḥmw Ššnq
- Predecessor: Osorkon A
- Successor: Merenptah
- Dynasty: 22nd Dynasty
- Pharaoh: Osorkon II
- Burial: Saqqara
- Father: Osorkon II
- Mother: Karomama
- Children: Takelot B

Shoshenq was a High Priest of Ptah during the 22nd Dynasty. Shoshenq was the eldest son of Osorkon II and Queen Karomama. He presided over the burial of the twenty-seventh Apis bull in Saqqara. For unknown reasons Shoshenq did not succeed to his father's throne and was buried in Memphis when Shoshenq III was king of Egypt. Shoshenq's tomb was found unplundered in 1942.

Shoshenq is known to have had a son named Takelot B. Through Takelot B he was the grandfather of a man named Pediese, who was a chief of the Ma, and the great-grandfather of a later High Priest of Ptah named Peftjauawybast.

Items belonging to Shoshenq include:

- Two naophorous kneeling statues (one now in Budapest, Museum of Fine Arts (51.2050), the other in Vienna, Kunsthistorisches Museum (ÄS 5773) - the latter statue, however, bears no securely identifying inscriptions). The Budapest statue gives the titles and family relations of Shoshenq: “Great Chief Prince of His Majesty, High Priest and Sem Priest of Ptah, Great King’s Son of the Lord of the Two lands Usimare Stepenamun, Son of Re, Lord of Epiphanies Osorkon (II) Meryamun Si-Bast, his mother being Karomama”
- A chalice, now in Berlin.
- A scarab in the Petrie Museum in London.
