= Sed Festival =

Ancient Egyptian ceremony

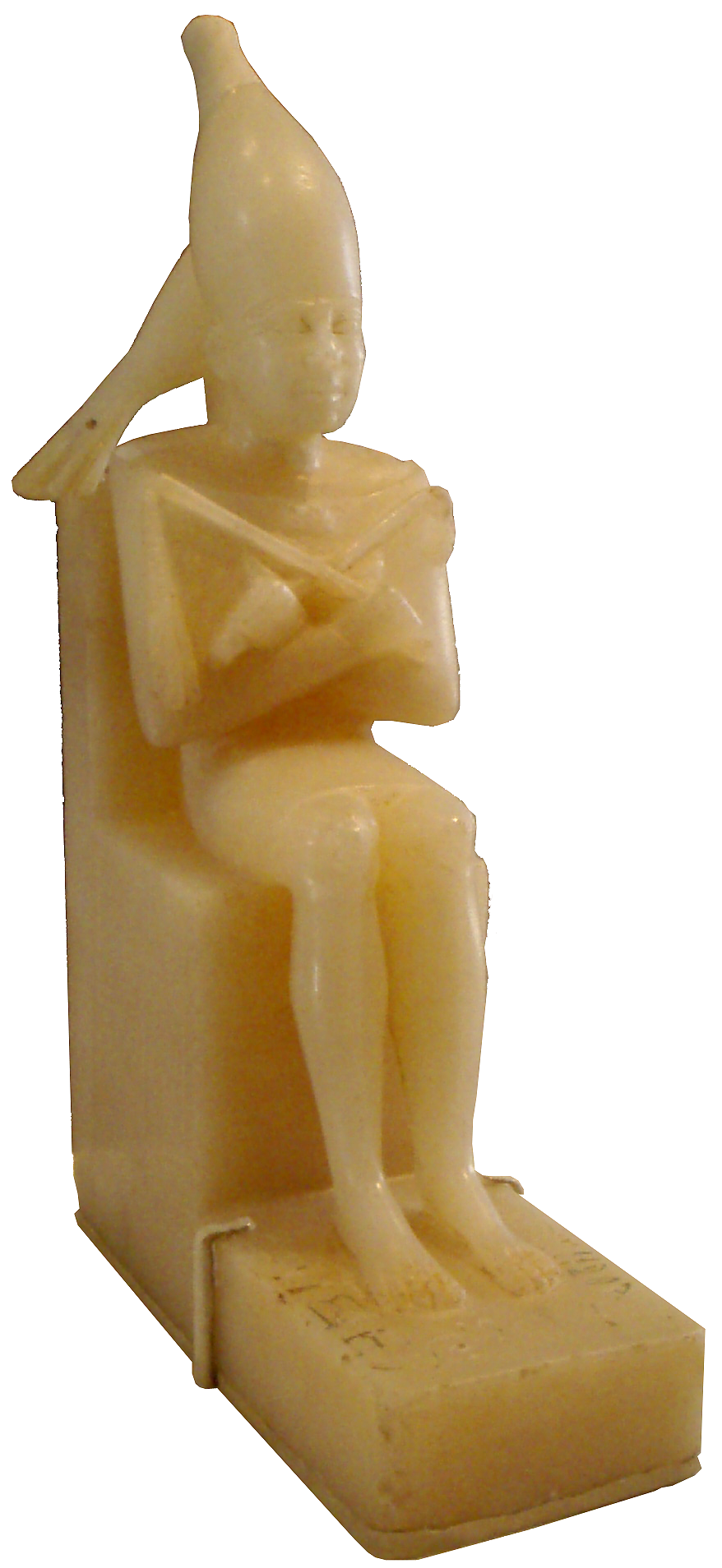
Alabaster sculpture of an Old Kingdom pharaoh, Pepi I Meryre, dressed to celebrate his Heb Sed, c. 2362 BCE, Brooklyn Museum

The Sed festival (ḥb-sd, conventional pronunciation /sɛd/; also known as Heb Sed or Feast of the Tail) was an ancient Egyptian ceremony that celebrated the continued rule of a pharaoh. The name is taken from the name of an Egyptian wolf god, one of whose names was Wepwawet or Sed. The less-formal feast name, the Feast of the Tail, is derived from the name of the animal's tail that typically was attached to the back of the pharaoh's garment in the early periods of Egyptian history. This tail might have been the vestige of a previous ceremonial robe made out of a complete animal skin.

The ancient festival might have been instituted to replace a ritual of executing a pharaoh who was unable to continue to rule effectively because of age or condition. Eventually, Sed festivals were jubilees celebrated after a ruler had held the throne for thirty years and then every three to four years after that. The festival, primarily, served to reassert pharaonic authority and state ideology. Sed festivals implied elaborate temple rituals and included processions, offerings, and such acts of religious devotion as the ceremonial raising of a djed, the base or sacrum of a bovine spine, a phallic symbol representing the strength, "potency and duration of the pharaoh's rule". The festival also involved symbolic reaffirmation of the pharaoh's rulership over Upper and Lower Egypt. Pharaohs who followed the typical tradition, but did not reign so long as 30 years had to be content with promises of "millions of jubilees" in the afterlife.

Despite the antiquity of the Sed festival and the hundreds of references to it throughout the history of ancient Egypt, the most detailed records of the ceremonies—apart from the reign of Amenhotep III—come mostly from "relief cycles of the Fifth Dynasty king Neuserra... in his sun temple at Abu Ghurab, of Akhenaten at East Karnak, and the relief cycles of the Twenty-second Dynasty king Osorkon II... at Bubastis."

== Festivals throughout history ==
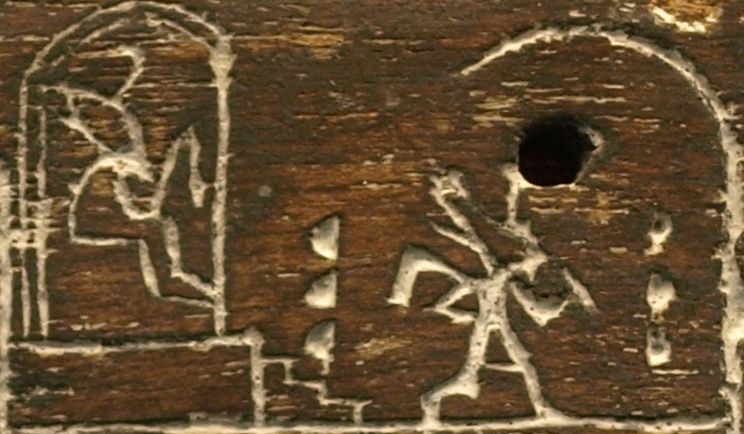
Detail from an ebony label of the First Dynasty pharaoh Den, depicting him running around the ritual boundary markers as part of the Sed festival.

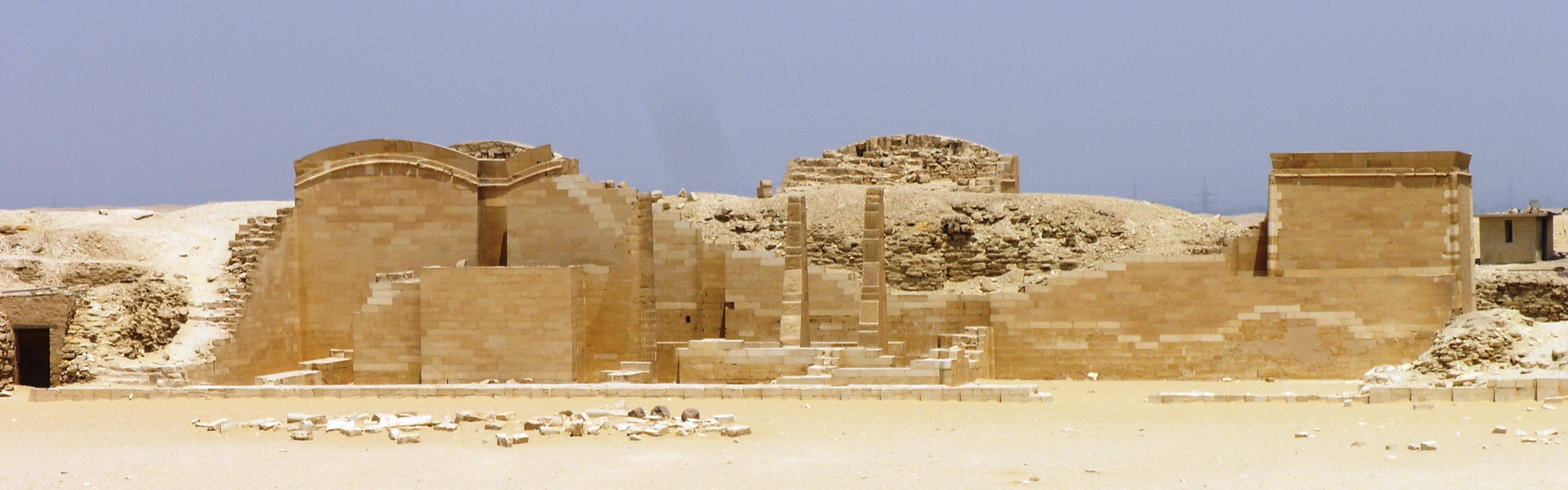
Heb-Sed court, south of Pyramid of Djoser in Saqqara, Egypt

=== Early Dynastic Period and Old Kingdom ===
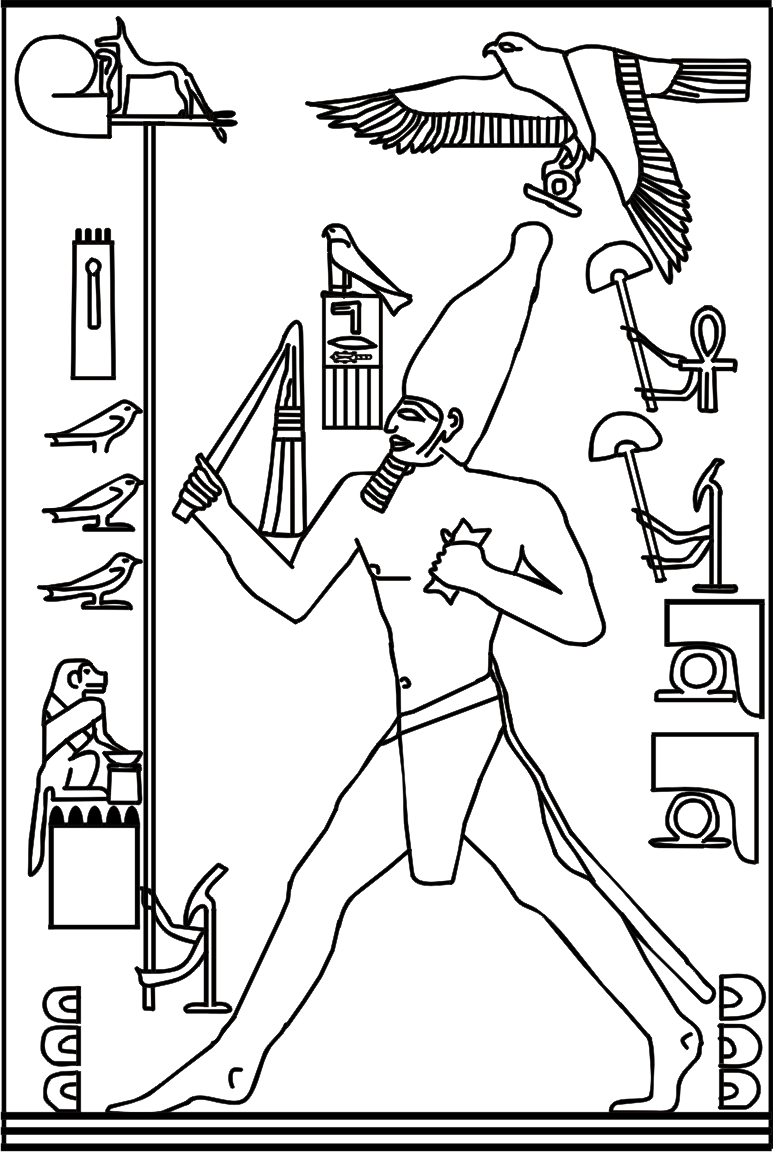
Detail from a relief from the underground galleries of the Step Pyramid of pharaoh Djoser running for the Heb-Sed celebration.

There is clear evidence for early pharaohs of the Early Dynastic Period and the Old Kingdom celebrating the Heb Sed, such as the First Dynasty pharaoh Den and the Third Dynasty pharaoh Djoser. In the Pyramid of Djoser, there are two boundary stones in his Heb Sed court, which is within his pyramid complex. He also is shown performing the Heb Sed in a false doorway inside his pyramid. The two boundary stones would have functioned as symbolic reminders of Djoser's dominion over Upper and Lower Egypt, and their placement within his mortuary complex would allow the king to continue carrying out the Heb-Sed in perpetuity after his death.

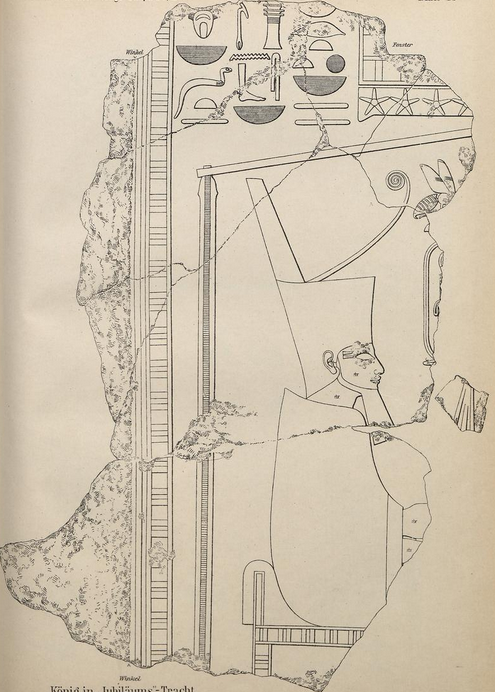
Relief of Sahure wearing the tunic of the Sed festival and the red crown of Lower Egypt.

One of the earlier Sed festivals for which there is substantial evidence is that of the Sixth Dynasty pharaoh Pepi I Meryre in the South Saqqara Stone Annal document, as the document corroborates a reign of at least 40 years, despite its damage. In addition, there are alabaster containers commemorating Pepi I's first Sed festival.

Given the subsequent First Intermediate Period, there is a lack of extant monuments and other manifestations of centralized state activity, creating a void of any evidence of a Sed festival after the Sixth Dynasty.

=== Middle Kingdom ===
During the Middle Kingdom, the power of the pharaoh became consolidated once again and monuments began to be built as they had previously in the Old Kingdom.

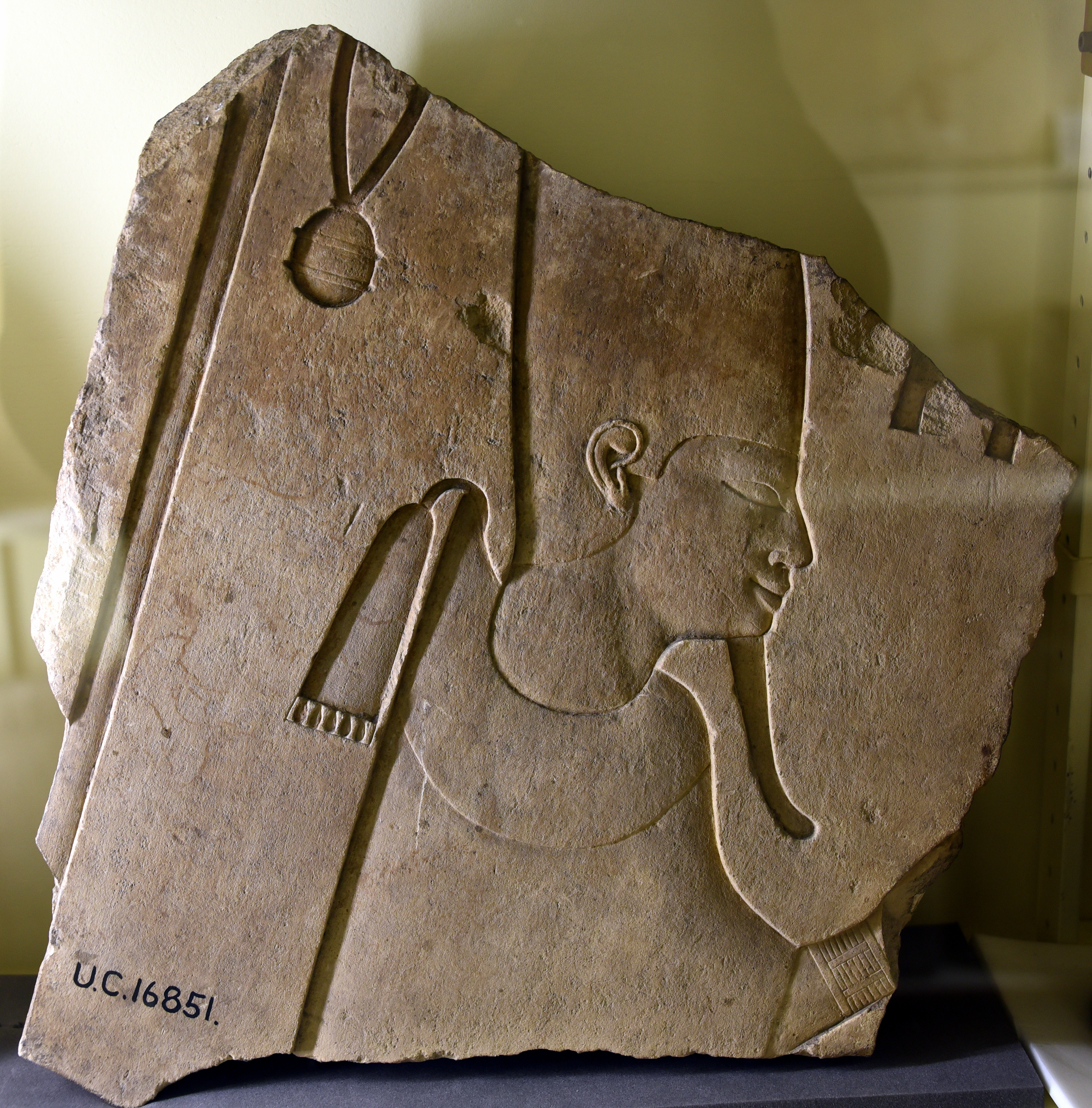
Limestone relief fragment shows an unidentified pharaoh wearing the heb-sed robe, white crown of Upper Egypt, and menat. From Koptos, Egypt. 12th Dynasty. Petrie Museum

Amenemhat I, based on evidence provided by foundation blocks in his pyramid, appears to have ruled coregent with his son Senusret I. Based upon the chronology presented by the monument, the 29th regnal year of Amenemhat I would have been the 10th regnal year of his son. Therefore, Amenemhat I would have been ineligible for a sed festival, at least per tradition. However, according to the Story of Sinouhe, it is recounted that preparations were underway for Amenemhat I to perform his first sed festival anyways before his assassination.

During his independent reign, Senusret I is notable both for his erection of the White Chapel, a pavilion meant to commemorate his Heb Sed, and for his Sed festival celebration taking place in his 31st year, as opposed to his 30th. The chapel would subsequently be incorporated into the Festival Hall of Thutmose II and Amenhotep III's Third Pylon at Karnak. Notably, Amenemhat II, despite appearing to have ruled for approximately 35 years, did not appear to have any kind of Heb-Sed.

=== New Kingdom ===
The most lavish of the Sed Festivals in the New Kingdom, judging by surviving inscriptions, were those of Amenhotep III (c. 1360 BCE) and Ramesses II (who had his first of over a dozen in approximately 1249 BCE). Several pharaohs seem to have deviated from the 30-year tradition, notably two pharaohs of the Eighteenth Dynasty, Hatshepsut and Akhenaten, rulers in a dynasty that was recovering from occupation by foreigners, reestablishing itself, and redefining many traditions.

Hatshepsut celebrated her Sed jubilee at Thebes, but she did this by counting the time she was the consort to her husband, and some recent research indicates that she did exercise authority usually reserved for pharaohs during his reign, thereby acting as a co-ruler rather than as his Great Royal Wife, the duties of which were assigned to their royal daughter. Upon her husband's death, the only eligible male in the royal family was a stepson and nephew of hers who was a child. He was made a consort and, shortly thereafter, she was crowned pharaoh. Some Egyptologists, such as Jürgen von Beckerath in his book Chronology of the Egyptian Pharaohs, speculate that Hatshepsut may have celebrated her first Sed jubilee to mark the passing of 30 years from the death of her father, Thutmose I, from whom she derived all of her legitimacy to rule Egypt. He had appointed his daughter to the highest administrative office in his government, giving her a co-regent's experience at ruling many aspects of his bureaucracy. This reflects an oracular assertion supported by the priests of Amun-Re that her father named her as heir to the throne.

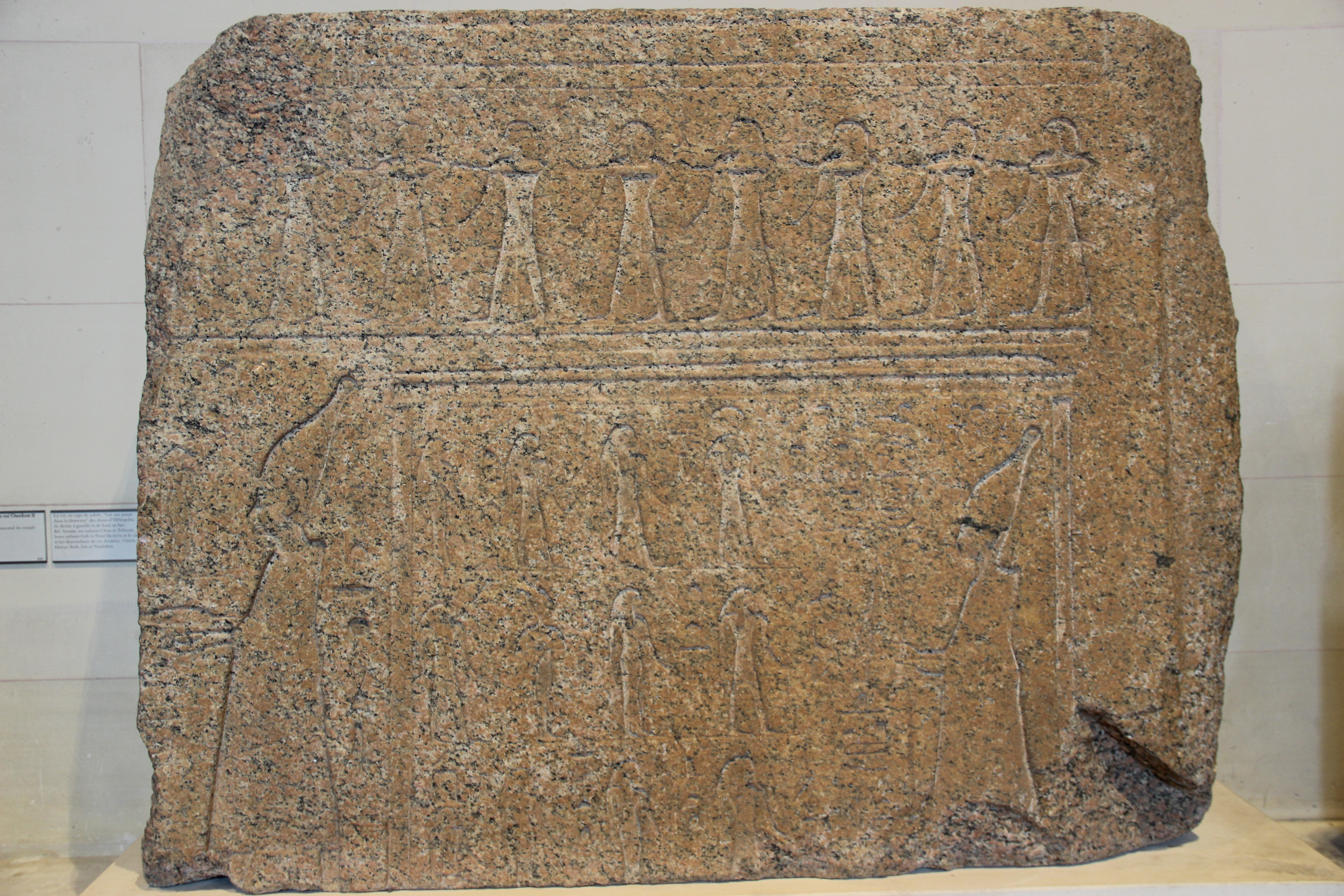
Bas relief depiction of Osorkon II's Sed festival from Bubastis. Louvre Museum, Paris

Akhenaten made many changes to religious practices in order to lessen the influence of the priests of Amun-Re, whom he saw as corrupt. His religious reformation may have begun with his decision to celebrate his first Sed festival in his third year of reign. His purpose may have been to gain an advantage against the powerful temple, since a Sed-festival was a royal jubilee intended to reinforce the pharaoh's divine powers and religious leadership. At the same time, Akhenaten also moved the capital of Egypt to Tell-el Amarna. Akhenaten established Tell-el Amarna for the sole worship of Aten, an unprecedented action by a pharaoh, which could explain as to why he would want to consolidate religious and political power. This is in contrast to Akhenaten's father Amenhotep III, who had emphasized the polytheistic status quo at his own Sed Festival.

=== Third Intermediate Period and Late Period ===
Sed festivals still were celebrated in the Third Intermediate Period by the later Libyan-era kings such as Shoshenq III, Shoshenq V, Osorkon I, who had his second Heb Sed in his 33rd year, and Osorkon II, who constructed a massive temple at Bubastis complete with a red granite gateway decorated with scenes of this jubilee to commemorate his own Heb-Sed. The final two pharaohs to celebrate a Sed festival were the 26th dynasty pharaohs Psamtik I and Amasis II.
