= Mikronisi =

Greek islet off the southern coast of Crete

Native name: Μικρονήσι
- Location within Greece

Geography
- Coordinates: 34.9275°N 24.8062°E
- Archipelago: Cretan Islands

Administration
- Greece
- Region: Crete
- Regional unit: Heraklion

Demographics
- Population: 0 (2001)

Mikronisi (Greek: Μικρονήσι, "small island", also known as Agios Pavlos Greek: Άγιος Παύλος, "St Paul") is an islet off the southern coast of the Greek island of Crete in the Libyan Sea. The islet is in a bay between the capes of Lithino and Kefalas, at Kommos, and close to Gortyn which was the ancient capital of Crete. It is administered within Heraklion regional unit.

== Group of islets ==
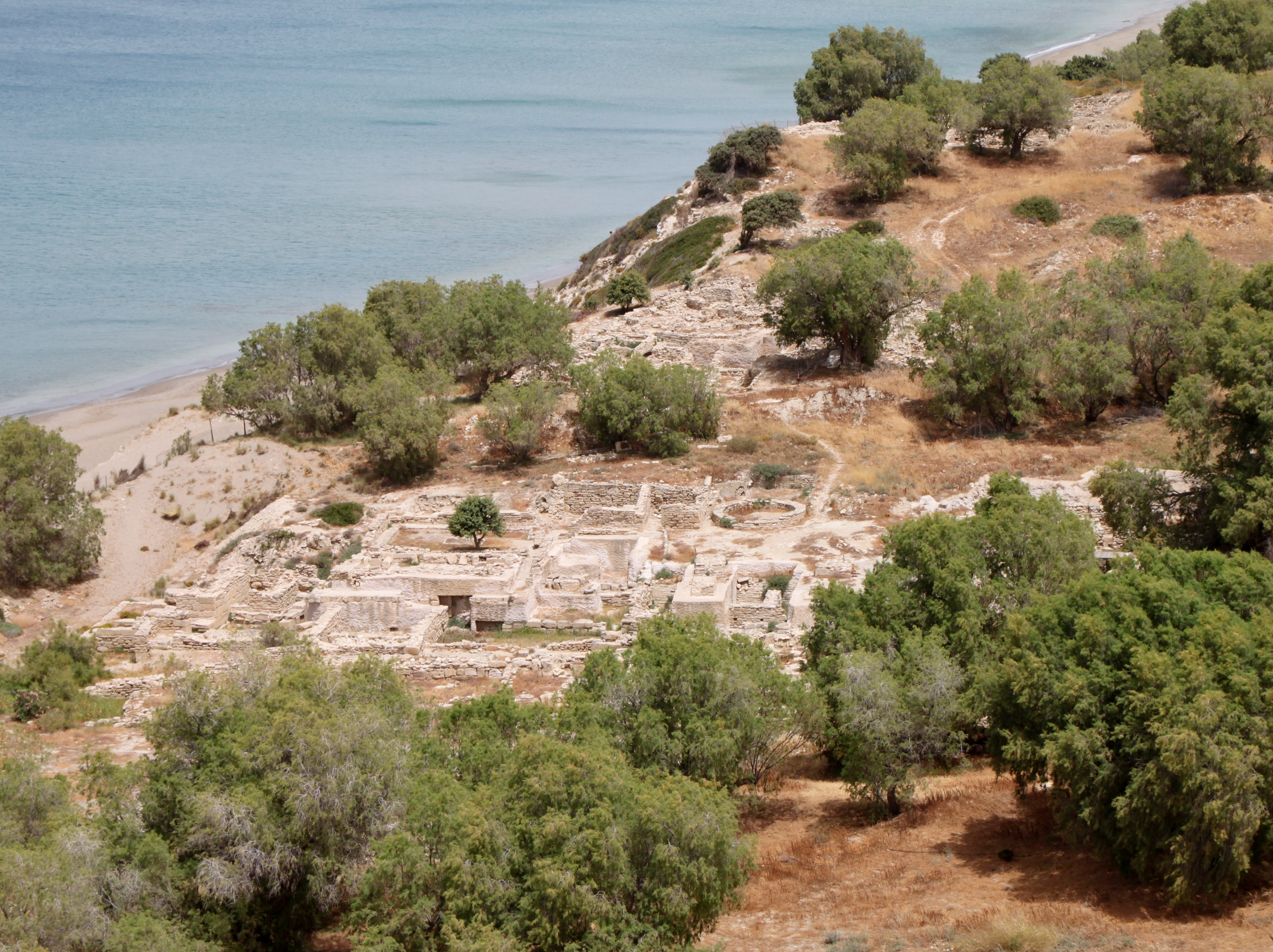
Archaeological site of Kommos

There are a group of four islets in the bay including Papadoplaka (to the west), Megalonisi (with the lighthouse), Mikronisi, and Trafos.
