= Trafos =

Island of Greece

Native name: Τράφος
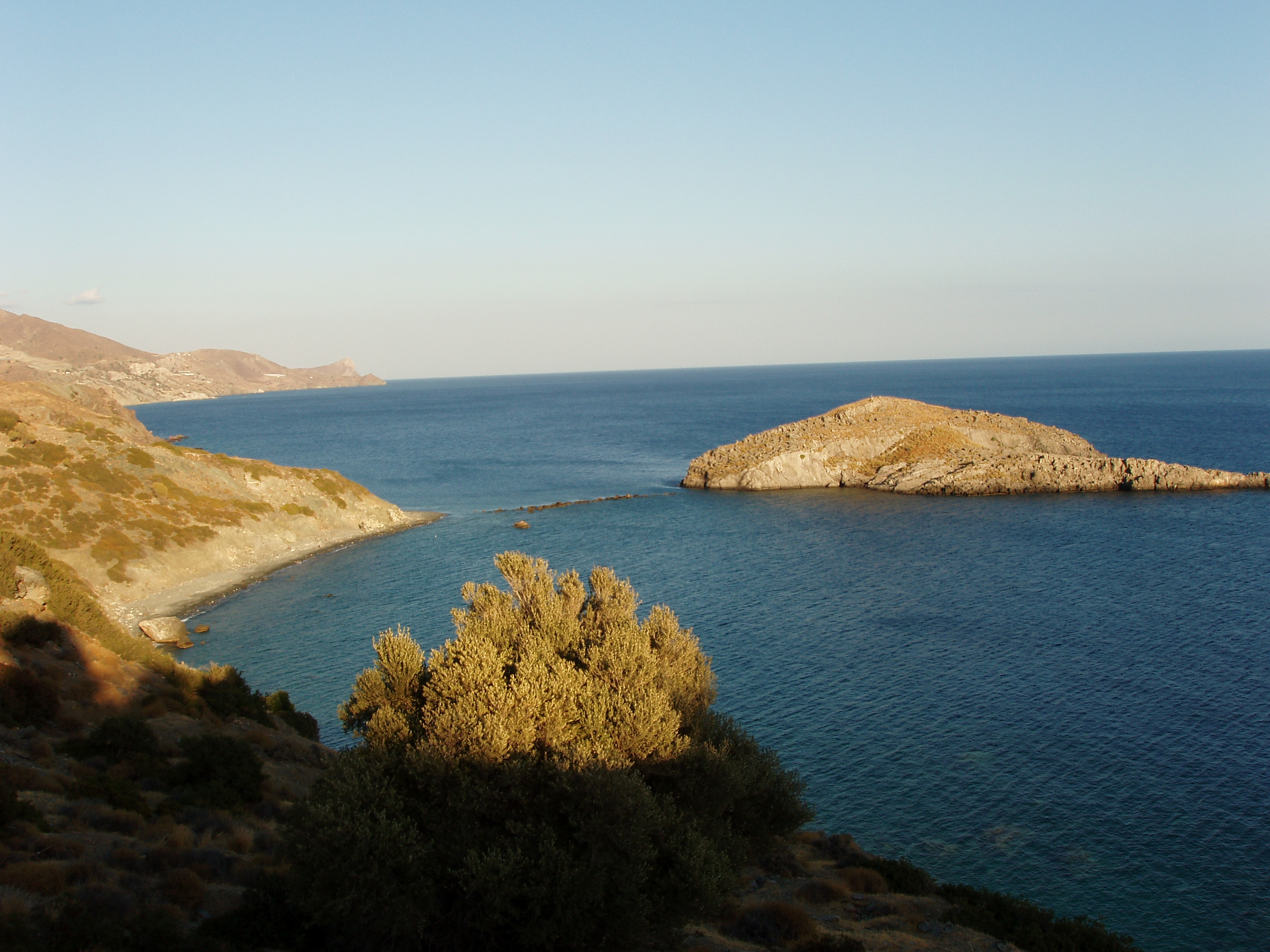
- Trafos islet

- Location within Greece

Geography
- Coordinates: 34.9366°N 24.8247°E
- Archipelago: Cretan Islands

Administration
- Greece
- Region: Crete
- Regional unit: Heraklion

Demographics
- Population: 0 (2001)

Trafos (Greek: Τράφος) is an islet off the southern coast of the Greek island of Crete in the Libyan sea. The islet is in a bay between the capes of Lithino and Kefalas, at Kommos, and close to Gortyn which was the ancient capital of Crete. It is administered within Heraklion regional unit. In 2000, the marine area around Trafos was established as an archaeological zone.

== Group of islets ==
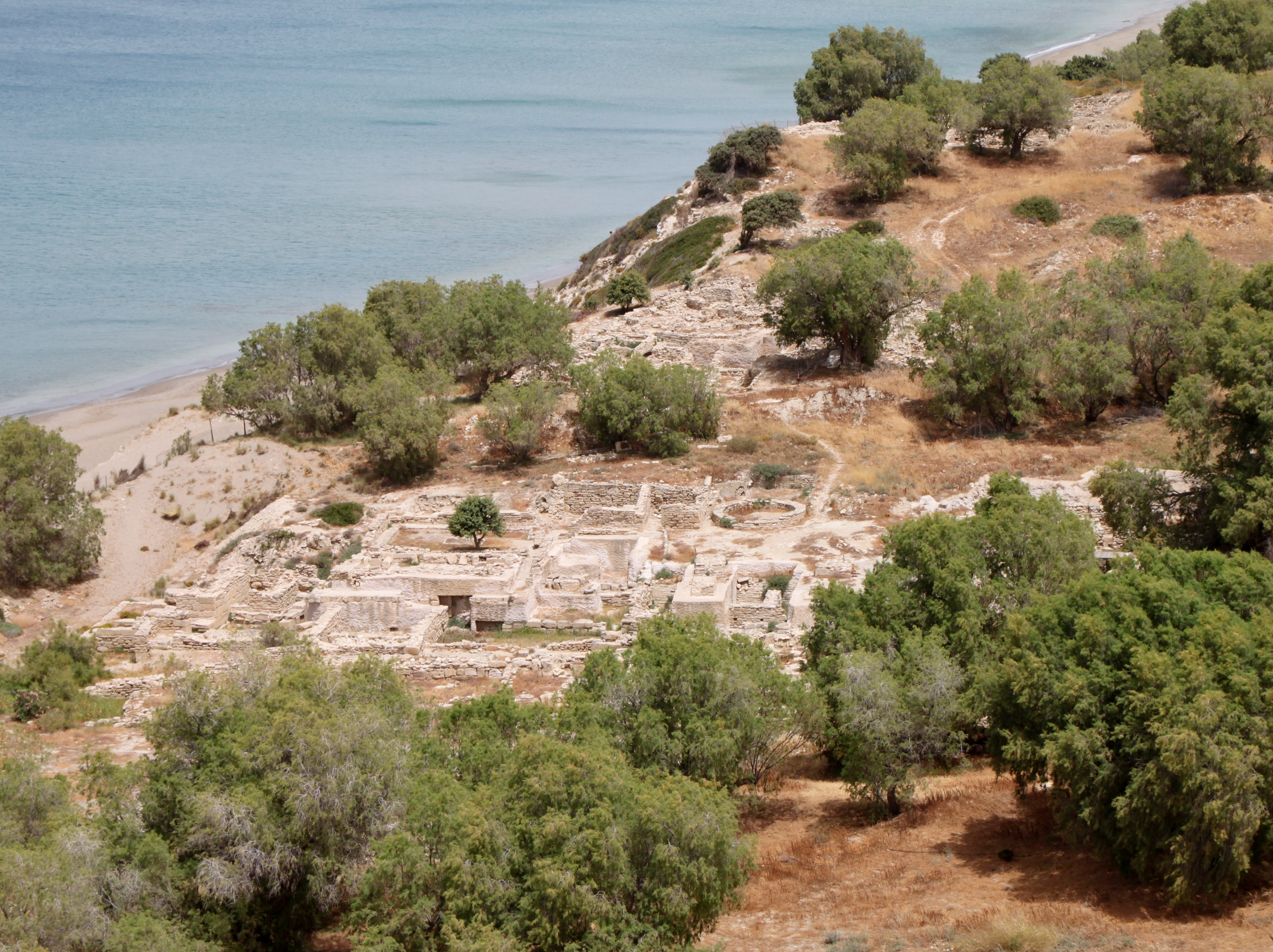
Archaeological site of Kommos

There are a group of four islets in the bay including Papadoplaka (to the west), Megalonisi (with the lighthouse), Mikronisi (also known as Agios Pavlos), and Trafos.
