= Megalonisi (Crete) =

Islet off the south coast of Crete, Greece

Native name: Μεγαλονήσι
- Location within Greece

Geography
- Coordinates: 34.923°N 24.8°E
- Archipelago: Cretan Islands

Administration
- Greece
- Region: Crete
- Regional unit: Heraklion

Demographics
- Population: 0 (2001)

Megalonisi (Greek: Μεγαλονήσι, "big island") is an uninhabited islet off the southern coast of the Greek island of Crete in the Libyan Sea that hosts a lighthouse. The islet is in a bay between the capes of Lithino and Kefalas, at Kommos, and close to Gortyn which was the ancient capital of Crete. It is administered within Heraklion regional unit.

== Group of islets ==
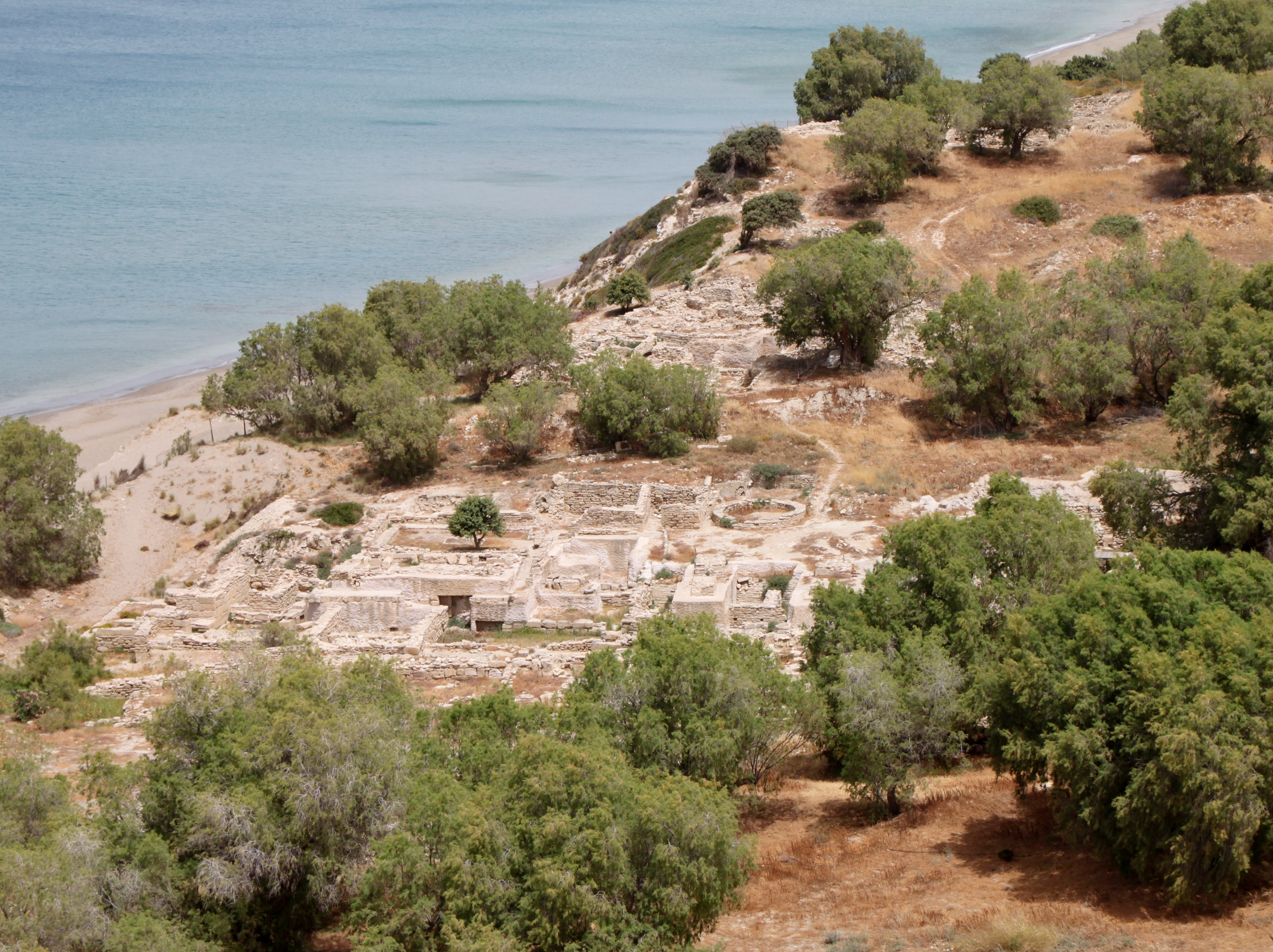
Archaeological site of Kommos

There is a group of four islets in the bay including Papadoplaka (to the west), Megalonisi (with the lighthouse), Mikronisi (also known as Agios Pavlos), and Trafos.
