= Ptah =

Ancient Egyptian deity

- Ptah, in the form of a mummified man (except for arms and face) standing on the symbol for Ma'at, holding a scepter or staff that bears the combined ankh-djed-was symbols
Name in hieroglyphs
p t H A40
- Major cult center: Memphis
- Symbol: the djed pillar, the bull
- Parents: none (self-created or un-created)
- Consort: Sekhmet and Bastet
- Offspring: Nefertem, Maahes, Imhotep, Anat, Qetesh, The Hemsut

Ptah (/tɑː/ TAH; Ancient Egyptian: ptḥ, reconstructed [piˈtaħ]; Ancient Greek: Φθά, romanized: Phthá; Coptic: ⲡⲧⲁϩ, romanized: Ptah; Phoenician: 𐤐𐤕𐤇, romanized: ptḥ) (Note: The entry for Ptah in Cyclopædia of Biblical, Theological and Ecclesiastical Literature also notes the name can also be rendered Phtha. See: McLintock, John; Strong, James, eds. (1867–1887). "Phtha or Ptah". Cyclopaedia of Biblical, theological, and ecclesiastical literature. Vol. VIII. Pet-Re --. New York: Harper and Brothers. ISBN 9780837017464. OCLC 682445427.) is an ancient Egyptian deity, a creator god, and a patron deity of craftsmen and architects. In the triad of Memphis, he is the husband of Sekhmet and the father of Nefertem. He was also regarded as the father of the sage Imhotep.

== Origin and symbolism ==
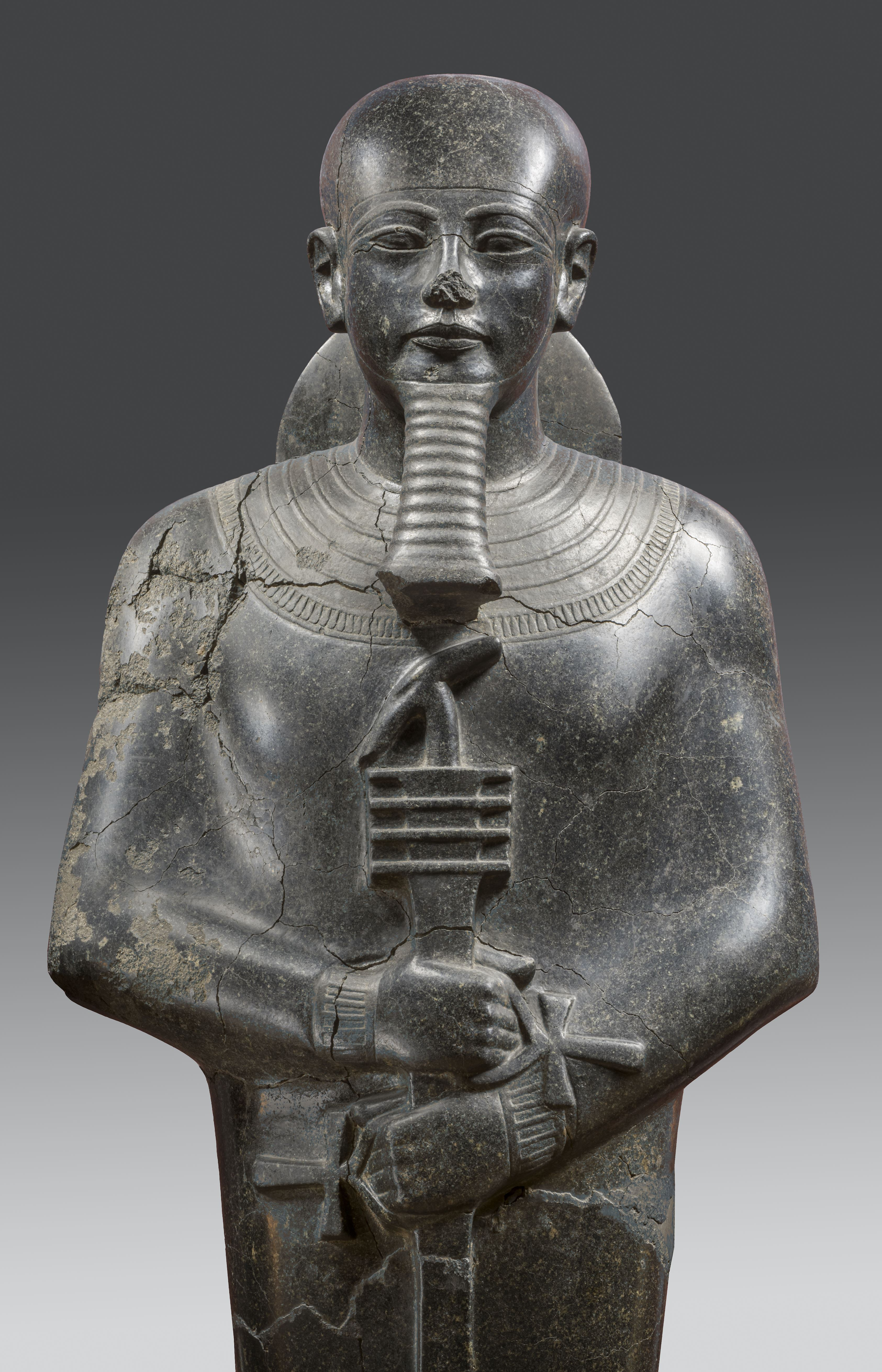
Statue of Ptah - Egyptian Museum of Turin, Italy

Ptah is an Egyptian creator God who conceived the world and brought it into being through the creative power of speech. A hymn to Ptah dating to the Twenty-second Dynasty of Egypt says Ptah "crafted the world in the design of his heart," and the Shabaka Stone, from the Twenty-Fifth Dynasty, says Ptah "gave life to all the gods and their kas as well, through this heart and this tongue." Ptah creating the world through heart and tongue, has been subject to comparative interest, in particular with the Jewish conceptions of divine word as a creative process.

=== Epithets ===
He bears many epithets that describe his role in ancient Egyptian religion and its importance in society at the time:

- Ptah the begetter of the first beginning
- Ptah lord of truth
- Ptah lord of eternity
- Ptah who listens to prayers
- Ptah master of ceremonies
- Ptah master of justice
- Ptah the God who made himself to be God
- Ptah the double being
- Ptah the beautiful face

== Representations and hypostases ==
Like many deities of ancient Egypt he takes many forms, through one of his particular aspects or through syncretism of ancient deities of the Memphite region. Sometimes represented as a dwarf, naked and deformed, his popularity would continue to grow during the Late Period. Frequently associated with the god Bes, his worship then moved beyond the borders of Egypt and was exported throughout the Eastern Mediterranean. Through dissemination by the Phoenicians, we find figures of Ptah in Carthage.

Ptah is generally represented in the guise of a man with green skin, contained in a shroud sticking to the skin, wearing the divine beard, and holding a sceptre combining three powerful symbols of ancient Egyptian religion:

- The Was sceptre
- The sign of life, Ankh
- The Djed pillar

These three combined symbols indicate the three creative powers of the god: power (was), life (ankh) and stability (djed).

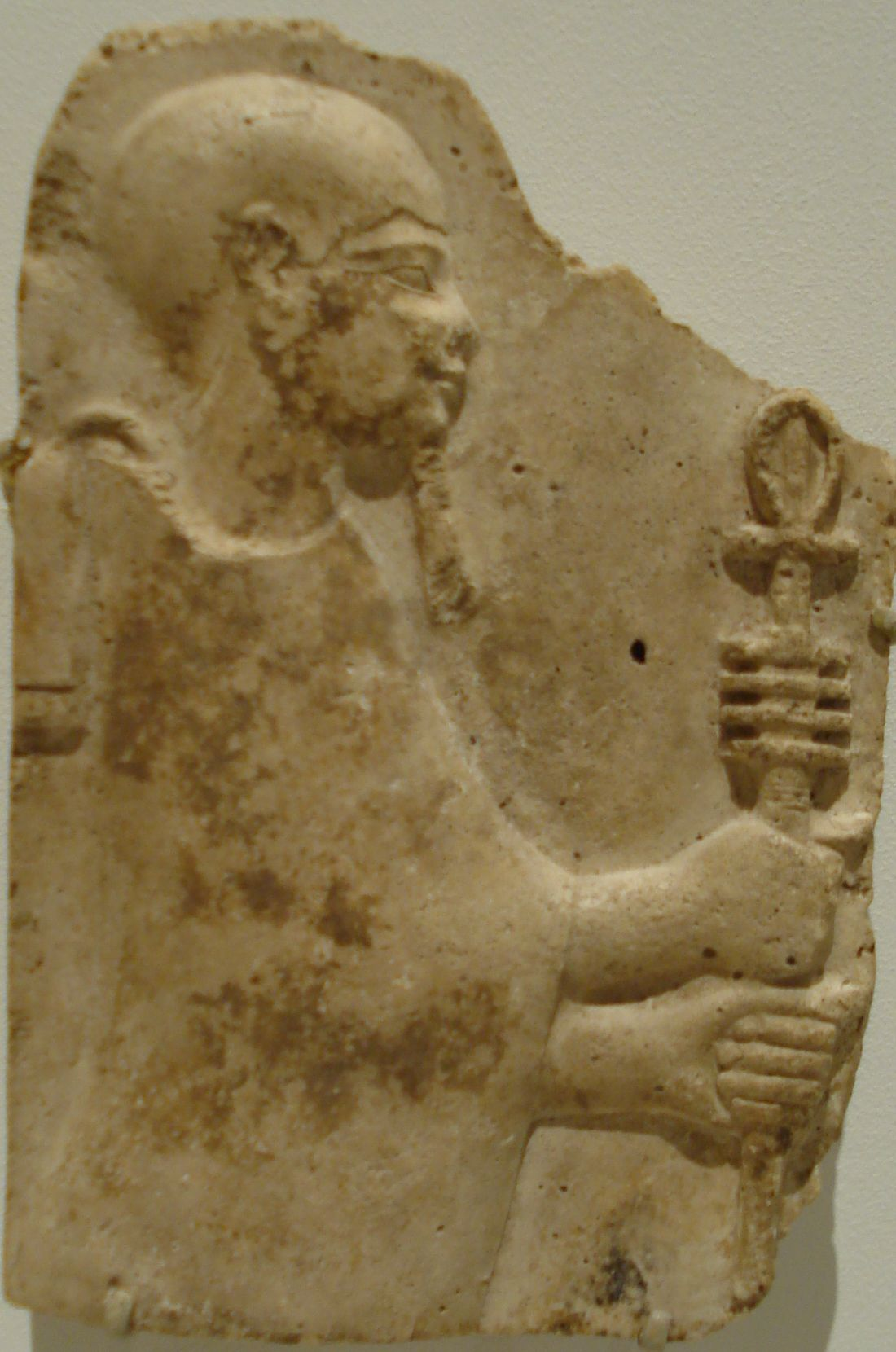
Stucco relief of Ptah holding a staff that bears the combined ankh and djed symbols, Late Period or Ptolemaic Dynasty, 4th to 3rd century BC

From the Old Kingdom, he quickly absorbs the appearance of Sokar and Tatenen, ancient deities of the Memphite region. His form of Sokar is found contained in its white shroud wearing the Atef crown, an attribute of Osiris. In this capacity, he represents the patron deity of the necropolis of Saqqara and other famous sites where the royal pyramids were built. Gradually he formed with Osiris a new deity called Ptah-Sokar-Osiris. Statuettes representing the human form, the half-human, half-hawk form, or simply the pure falcon form of the new deity began to be systematically placed in tombs to accompany and protect the dead on their journey to the West.

His Tatenen form is represented by a young and vigorous man wearing a crown with two tall plumes that surround the solar disk. He thus embodies the underground fire that rumbles and raises the earth. As such, he was particularly revered by metalworkers and blacksmiths, but he was equally feared because it was he who caused earthquakes and tremors of the Earth's crust. In this form also, Ptah is the master of ceremonies for Heb Sed, a ceremony traditionally attesting to the first thirty years of a pharaoh's reign.

The god Ptah could correspond with the sun deities Re or Aten during the Amarna period, where he embodied the divine essence with which the sun god was fed to come into existence, that is to say to be born, according to the Memphite mythological/theological texts. In the holy of holies of his temple in Memphis, as well as in his great sacred boat, he drove in procession to regularly visit the region during major holidays. Ptah was also symbolized by two birds with human heads adorned with solar disks, symbols of the souls of the god Re: the Ba. The two Ba are identified as the twin gods Shu and Tefnut and are associated with the djed pillar of Memphis.

Finally, Ptah is embodied in the sacred bull, Apis. Frequently referred to as a herald of Re, the sacred animal is the link with the god Re from the New Kingdom. He even received worship in Memphis, probably at the heart of the great temple of Ptah, and upon the death of the animal, was buried with all the honours due to a living deity in the Serapeum of Saqqara.

Scholars have also associated Ptah with the Mandaean angel Ptahil outside of Egypt, due to their somewhat similar features and closely related names.

== Development of the cult ==
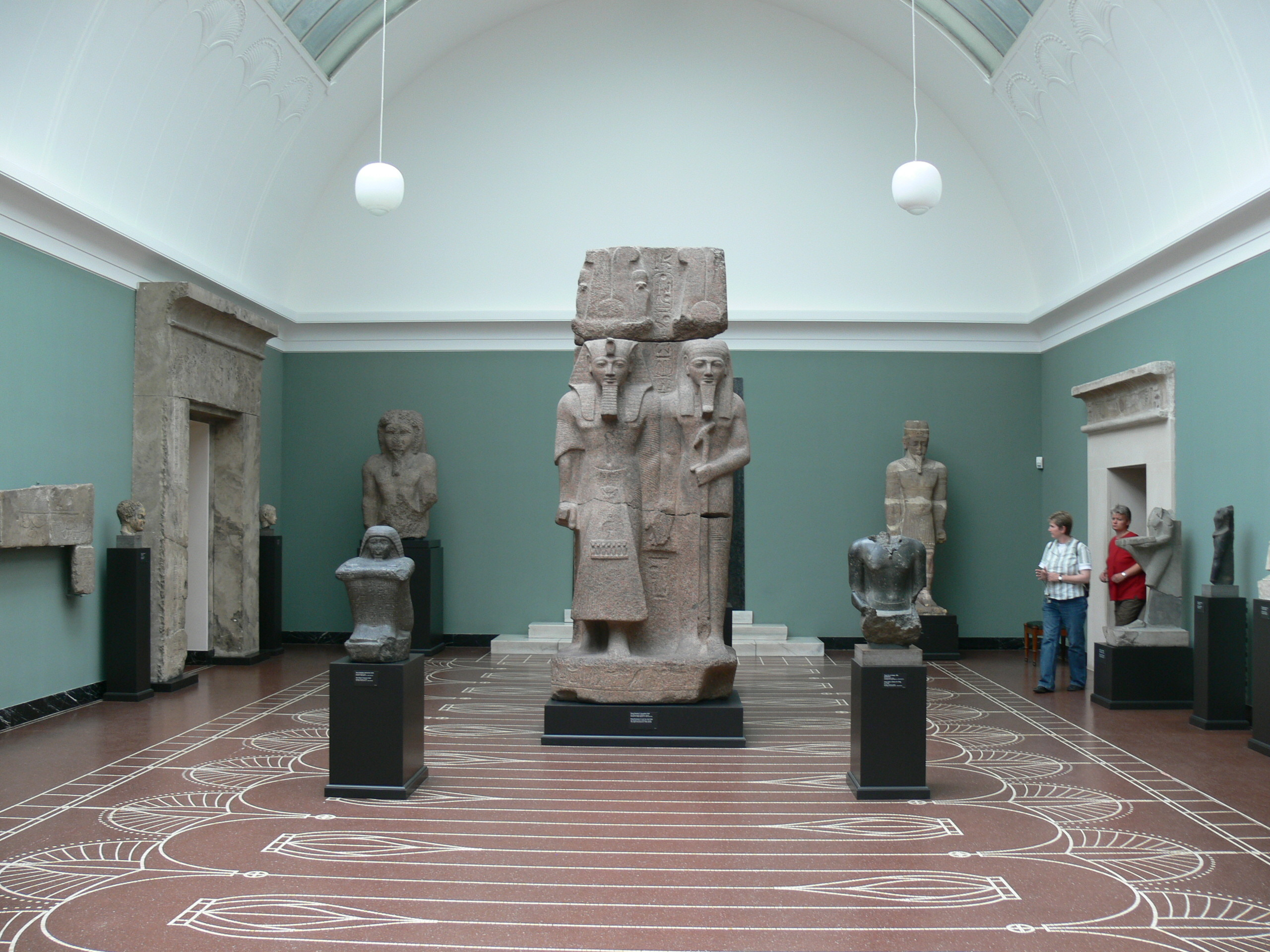
Colossal statue of the god Ptah-Tatenen holding hands with Ramesses II found at Memphis – Ny Carlsberg Glyptotek, Copenhagen

The cult of the god Ptah quickly spread throughout Egypt. With the major royal projects of the Old Kingdom, the high priests of Ptah were particularly sought after and worked in concert with the vizier, filling the role of chief architects and master craftsmen, responsible for the decoration of the royal funerary complexes.

In the New Kingdom, the cult of the god would develop in different ways, especially in Memphis, his homeland, but also in Thebes, where the workers of the royal tombs honoured him as patron of craftsmen. For this reason, the oratory of Ptah who listens to prayers was built near the site of Deir el-Medina, the village where the workers and craftsmen were housed. At Memphis, the role of intercessor with humans was particularly visible in the appearance of the enclosure that protected the sanctuary of the god. Large ears were carved on the walls, symbolizing his role as god who listens to prayers.

With the Nineteenth Dynasty, his cult grew and he became one of the four great deities of the empire of Ramesses. He was worshipped at Pi-Ramesses as master of ceremonies and coronations.

With the Third Intermediate Period, Ptah returned to the centre of the monarchy where the coronation of the pharaoh was held again in his temple. The Ptolemies continued this tradition, and the high priests of Ptah were then increasingly associated with the royal family, with some even marrying princesses of royal blood, clearly indicating the prominent role they played in the Ptolemaic court.

== Main places of worship ==
Temple dedicated to	Location
Ptah	Pi-Ramses
Ptah	Memphis
Ptah	Karnak (Thebes)
Ptah	Gerf Hussein (Nubia)
Ptah who is south of his Wall	Memphis
Ptah who listens to prayers	Memphis
Ptah who listens to prayers	Deir el-Medina (Thebes)
Ptah lord of truth	Abu Simbel (Nubia)
Ptah-Sokar	Abydos
Ptah-Sokar	Kom el-Hettan (Thebes)

== Legendary Rule over Egypt ==
Ptah, according to the Turin Kings List, was also the first to rule Egypt, succeeded by Ra, who was succeeded by Sosis (Shu), who was succeeded by Geb, in turn succeeded by Osiris, succeeded by Set, then by Horus.

== Gallery ==
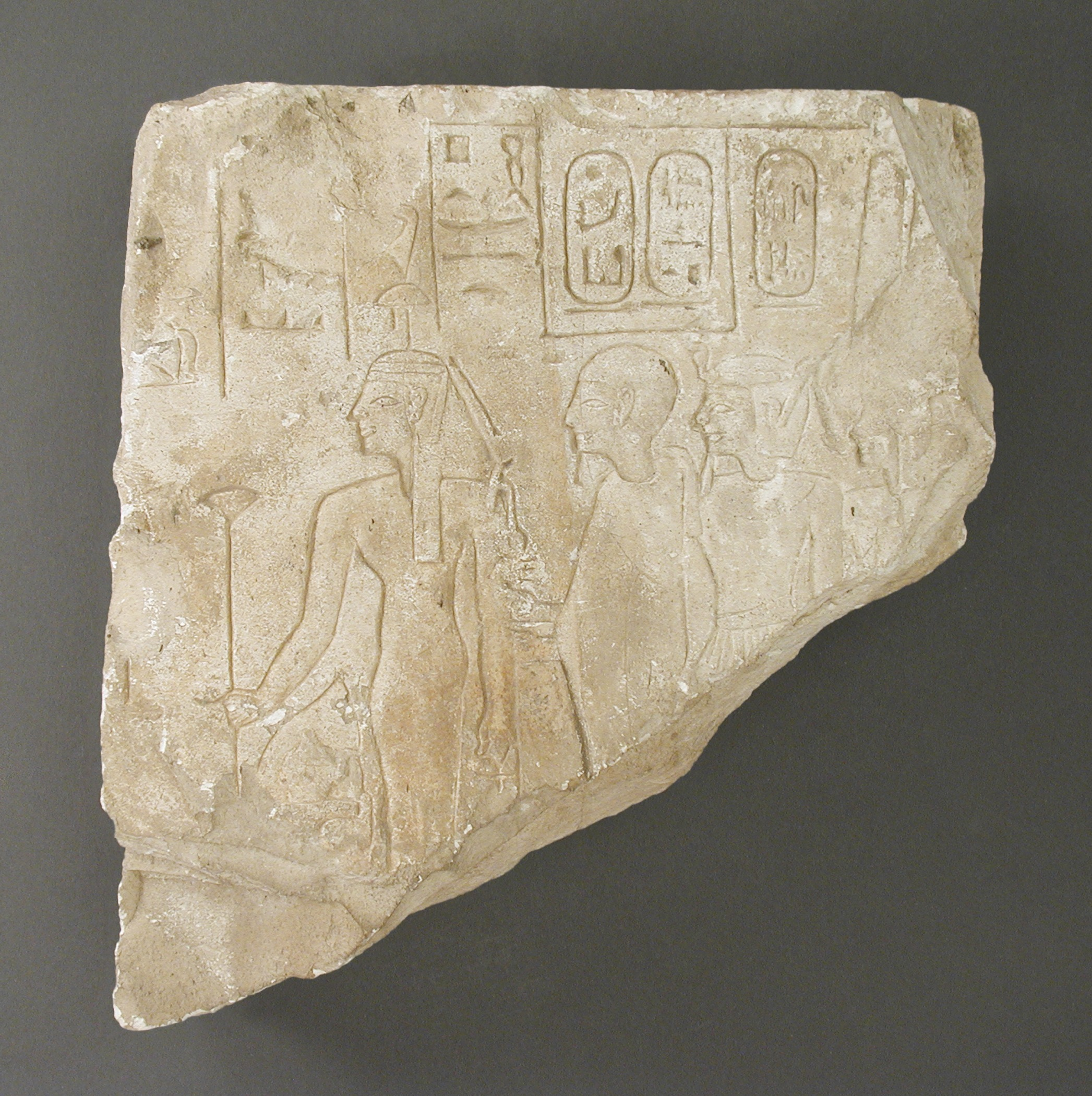
Relief fragment depicting Imenet, Ptah and Amenhotep I; 1569–1081 BC; limestone; 21 × 17.5 cm; Los Angeles County Museum of Art (US)

The Memphite Triad on a Solar barque including Ptah, Sekhmet, and Nefertem.

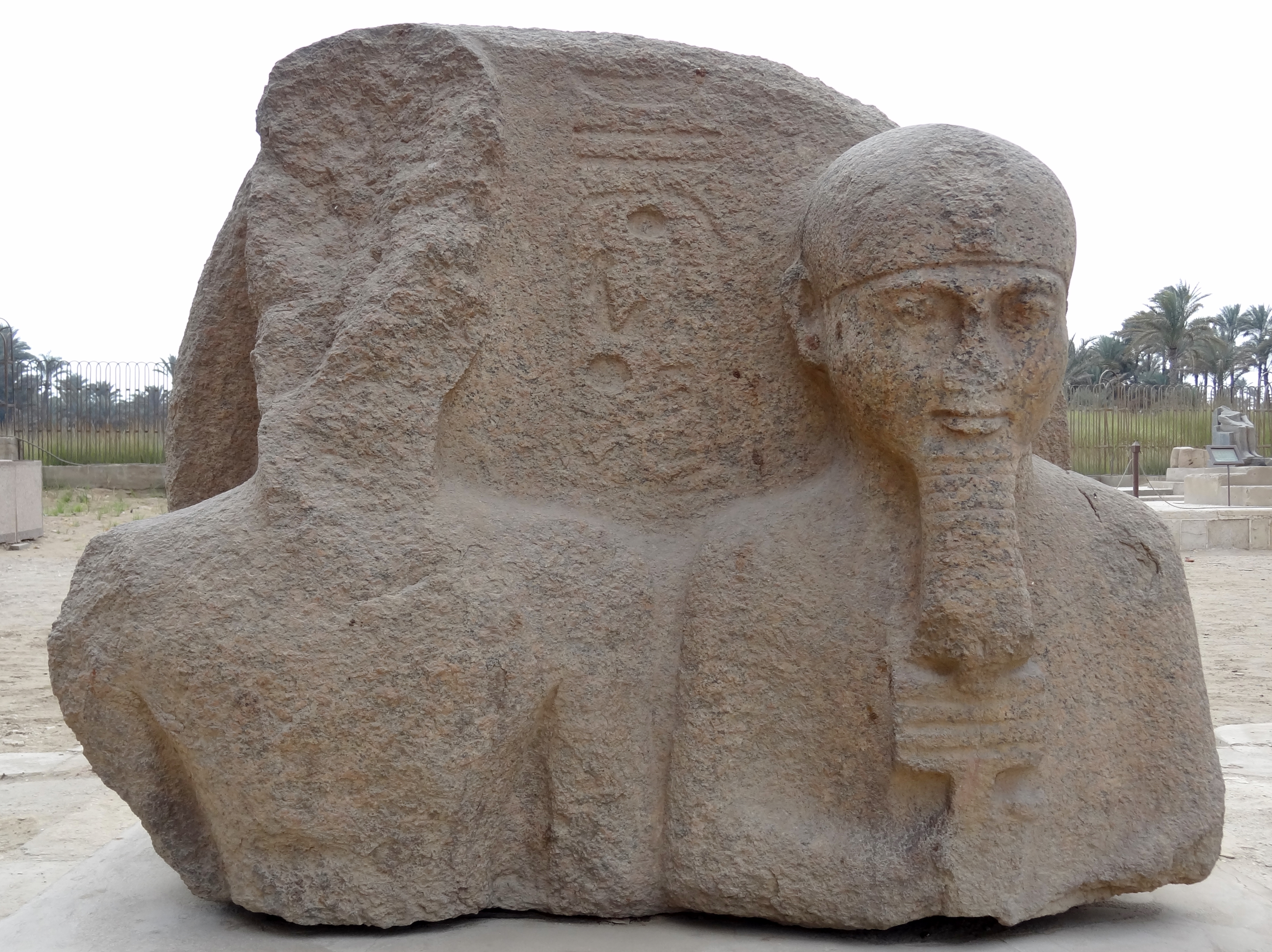
Damaged statue of Ramses II with Ptah; 1292–1189 BC; granite; Memphis open-air museum (Egypt)

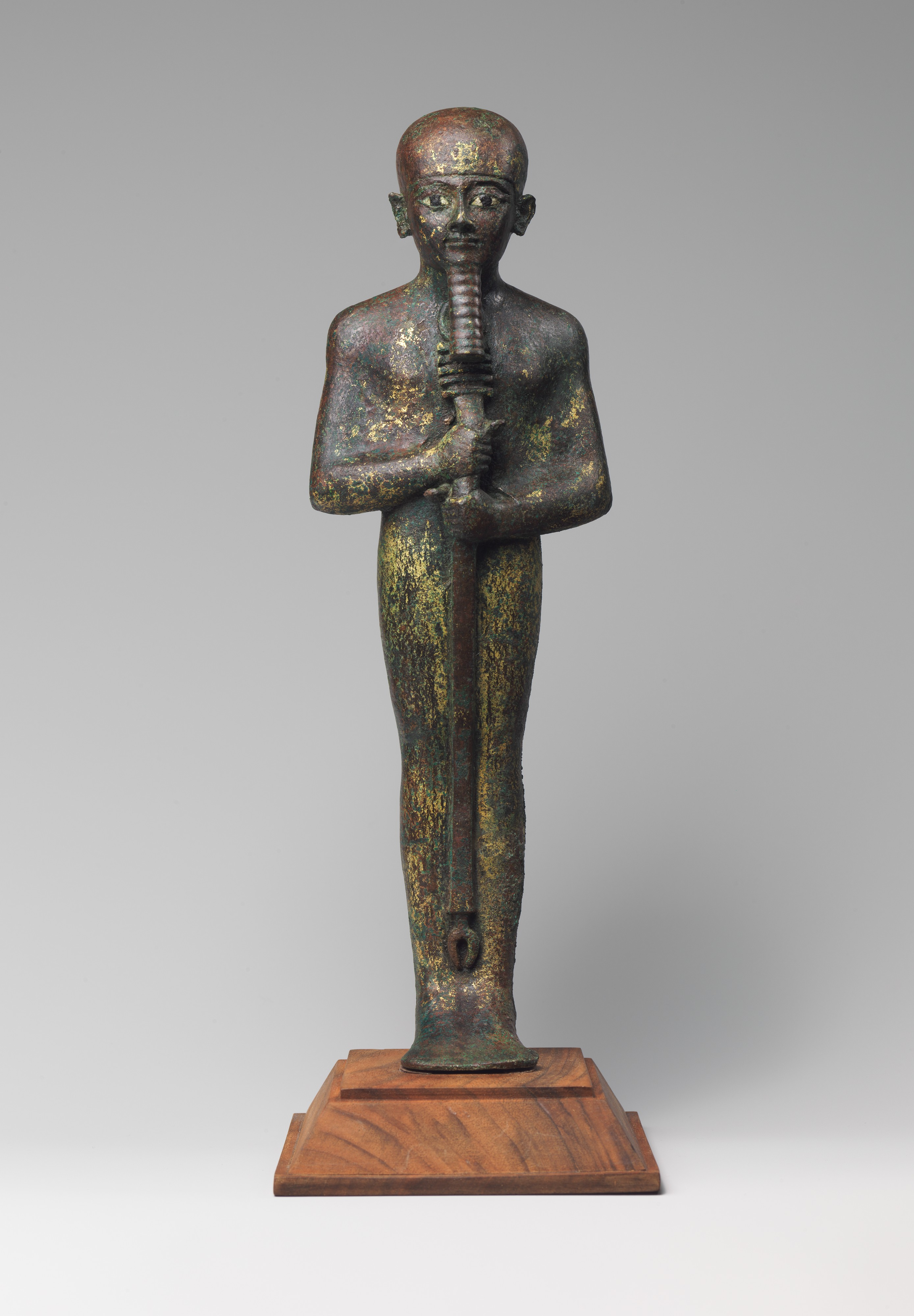
Ptah statue; 1070–712 BC; bronze, gold leaf and glass; height: 29.5 cm; Metropolitan Museum of Art

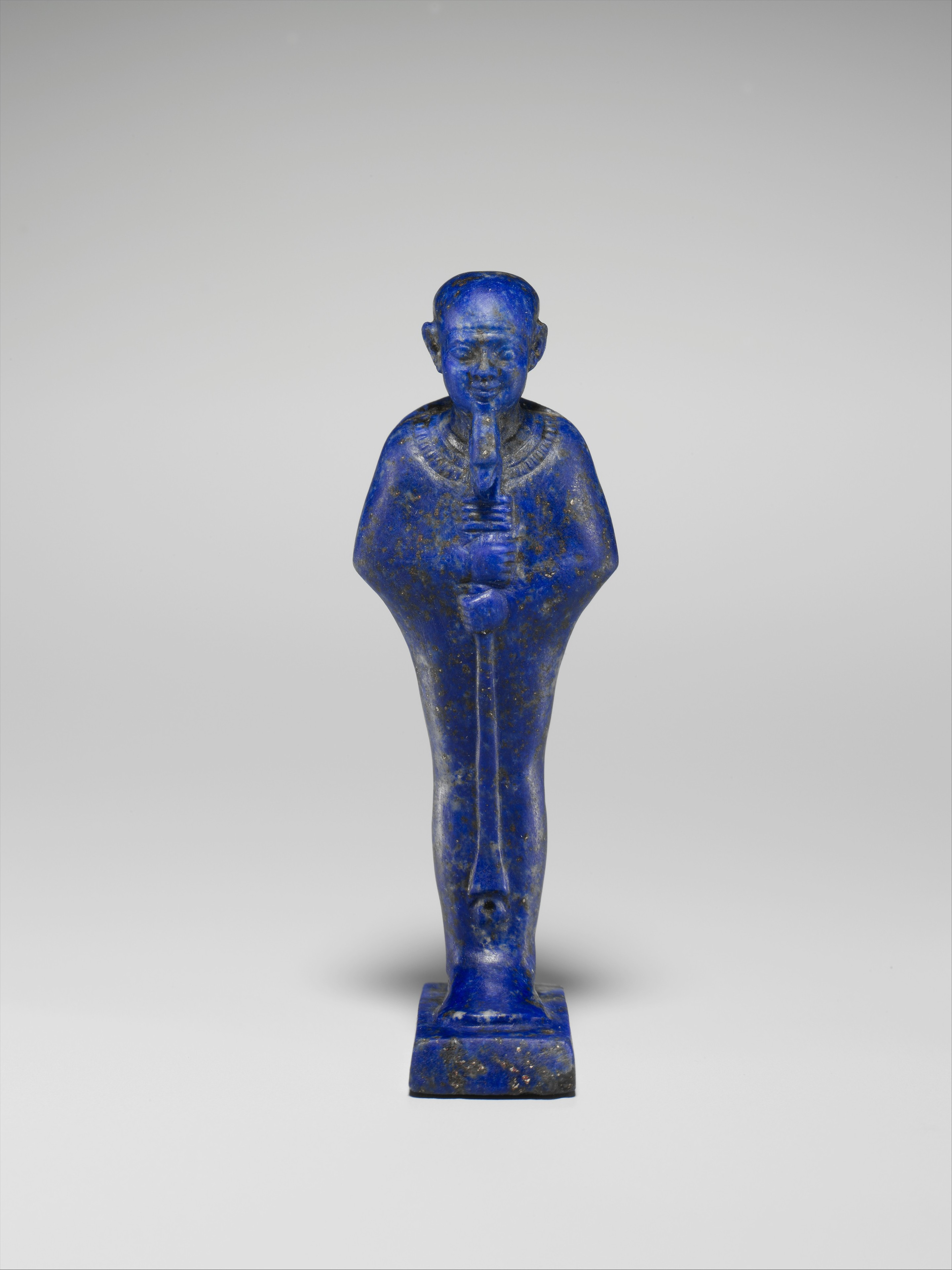
Ancient Egyptian cult image of Ptah; 945–600 BC; lapis lazuli; height of the figure: 5.2 cm, height of the dais: 0.4 cm; Metropolitan Museum of Art

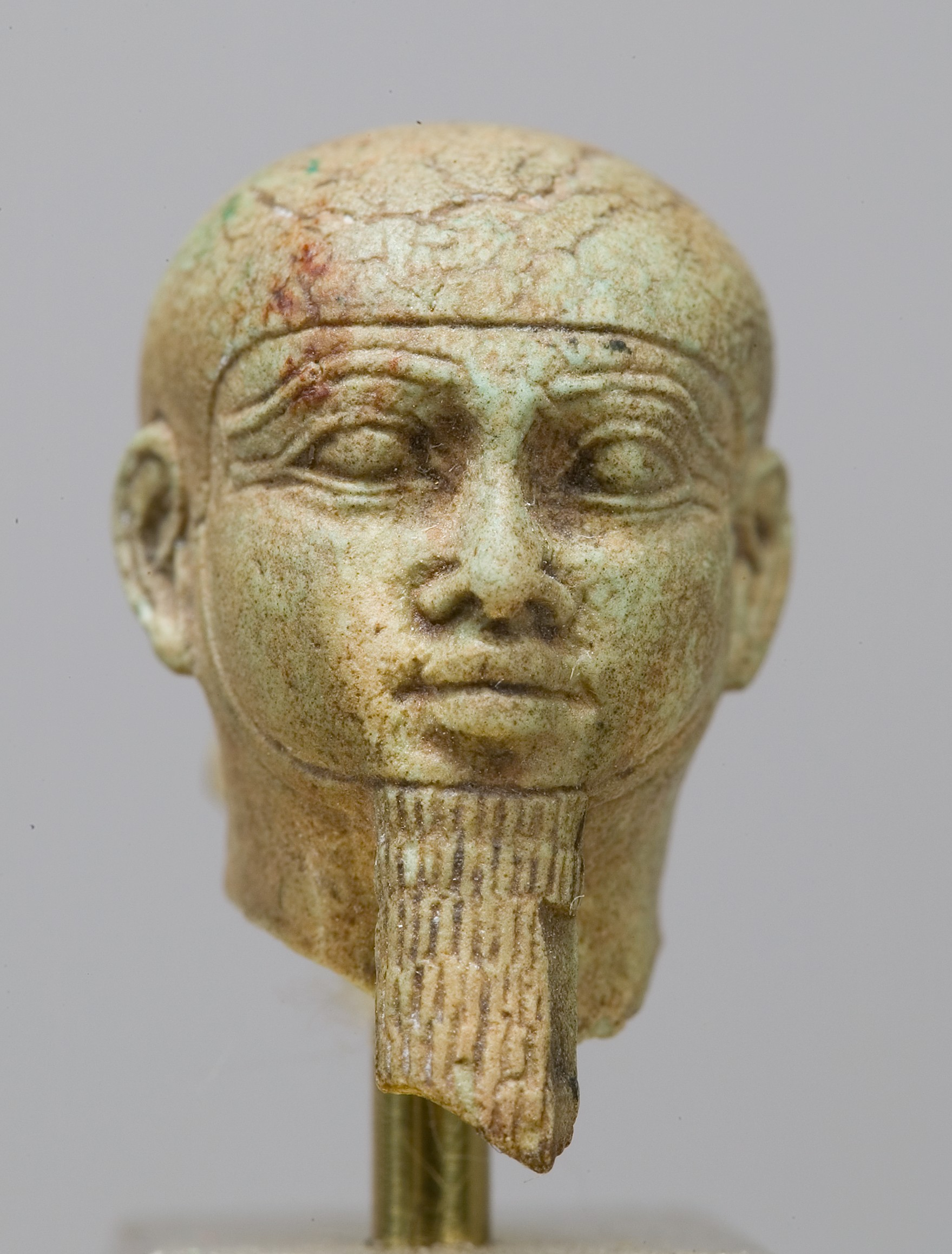
Head of Ptah; late 8th–mid 7th century BC; limestone; height: 1.58 cm; Metropolitan Museum of Art

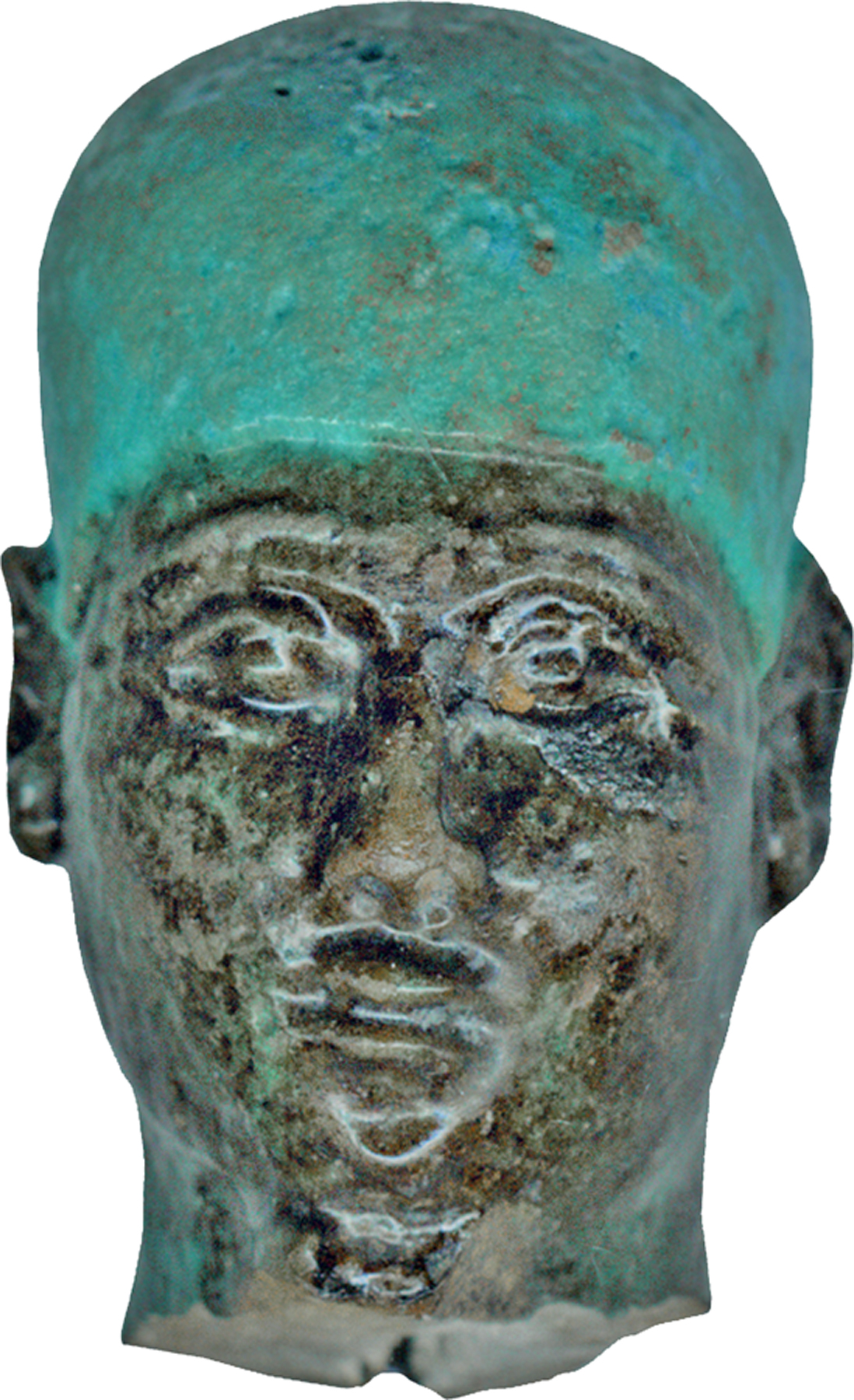
Head of Ptah; 664–525 BC; faience with blue-green and black glaze; height: 3.5 cm, width: 2.1 cm, depth: 3 cm; Walters Art Museum (Baltimore, US

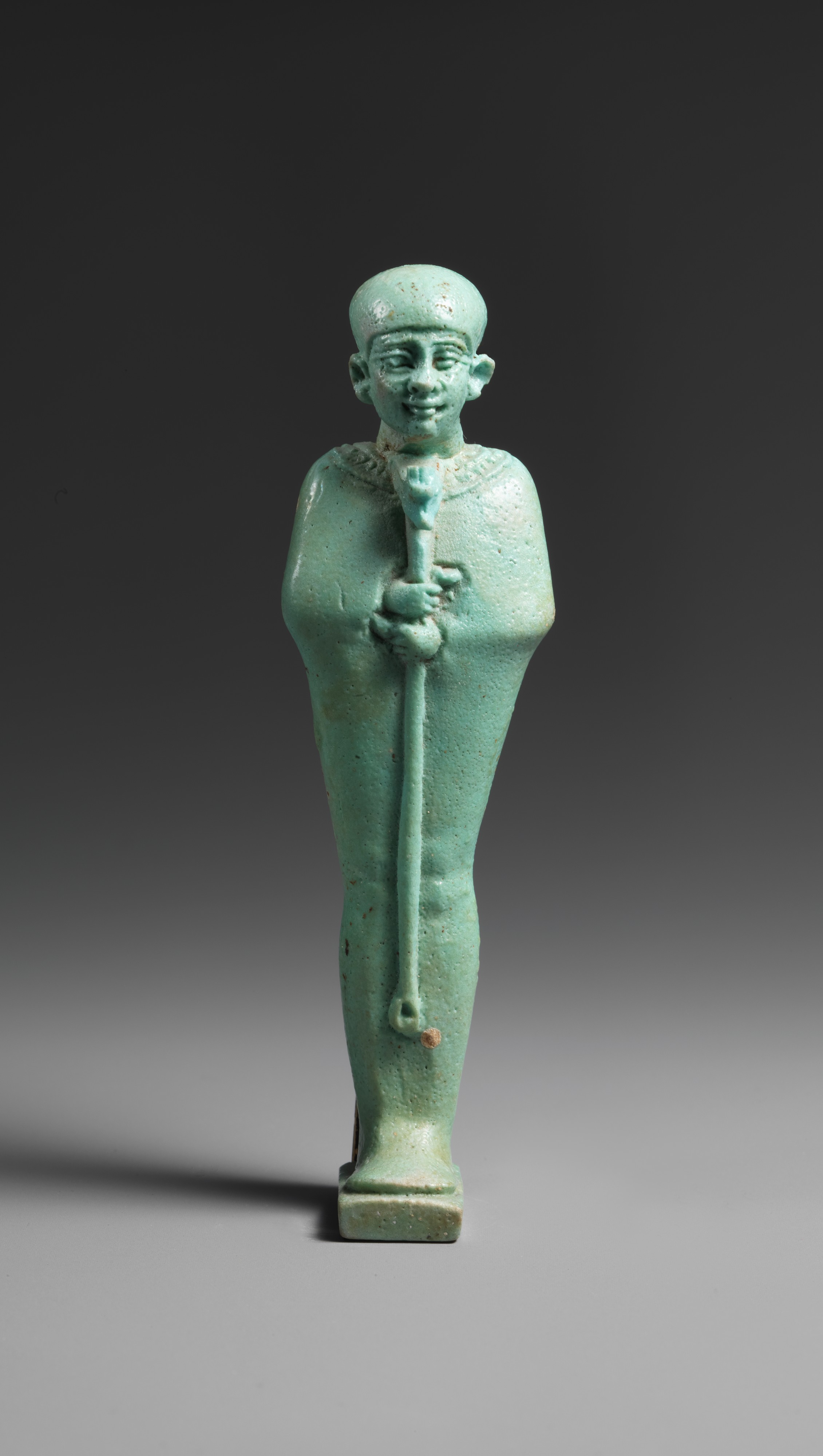
Standing figure of Ptah; 664–332 BC; faience; height: 9.7 cm; Metropolitan Museum of Art

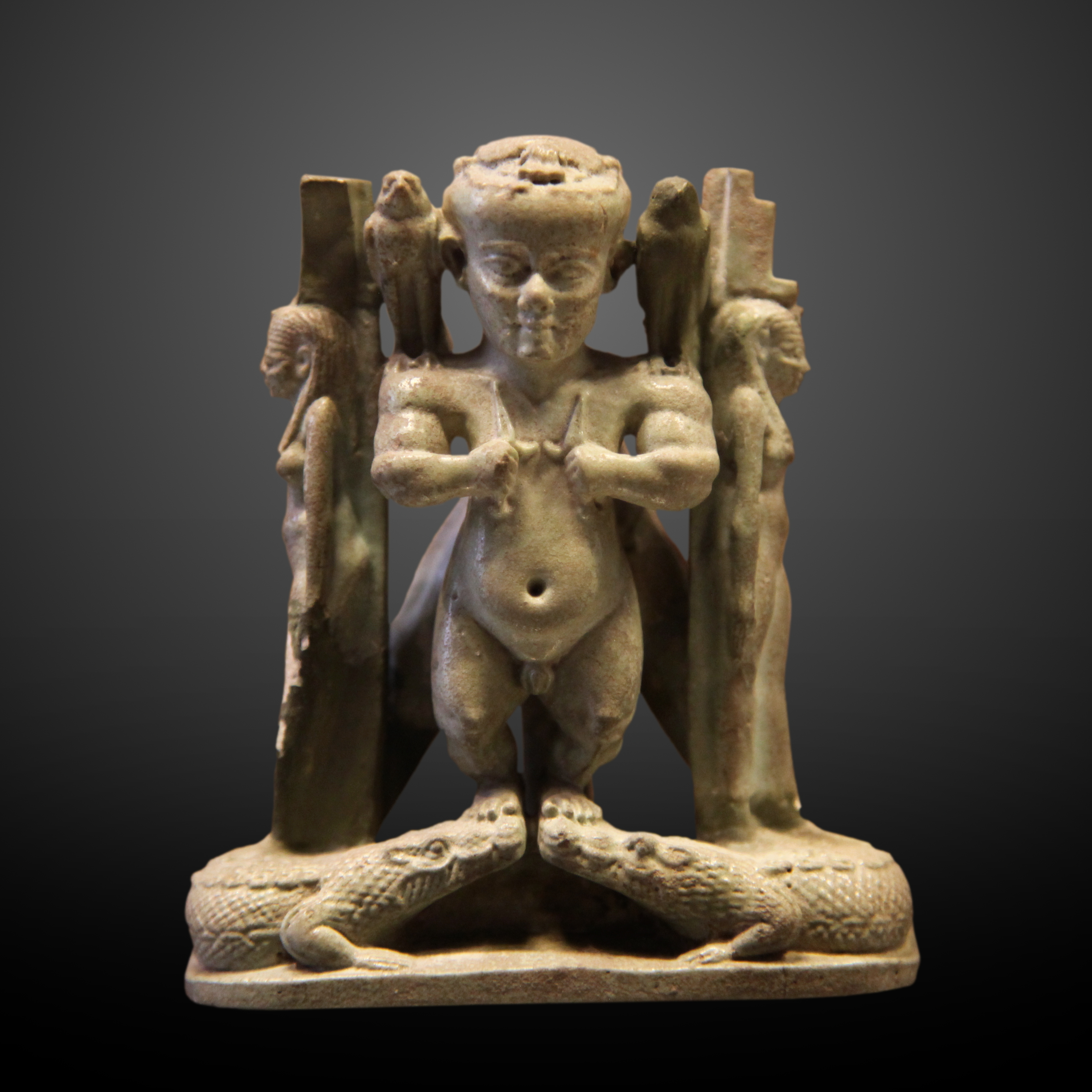
Ptah-Patek; 4th–3rd century BC; faience; height: 8.5 cm, width: 7.3 cm, thickness: 3.1 cm; Louvre

== Legacy ==
Memphis was believed to be under the protection of the god Ptah, the patron of craftsmen. Its great temple, Hut-ka-Ptah (meaning "Enclosure of the ka of Ptah"), was one of the most prominent structures in the city. This word entered Ancient Greek as Αἴγυπτος (Aiguptos), which entered Latin as Aegyptus, which developed into Middle French Egypte and was finally borrowed into English first as Egipte in Middle English and ultimately as Egypt.

Ptah is one of the deities mentioned in Giuseppe Verdi's opera Aida. He is invoked in a chorus, "Possente Fthà" ("O Mighty Ptah"), in Act 1, scene 2; this chorus is reprised as "Immenso Fthà" ("Immense Ptah"), at the end of the opera as the protagonists Aida and Radamès die.

5011 Ptah is an asteroid named after the Egyptian god.

== See also ==
- Kothar-wa-Khasis – Ugaritic, Egyptian and Phoenician craftsman god
- Ptahil – Uthra (angelic being) in Mandaeism
- Vishvakarma – Divine architect of the Hindu gods
- Asgard's Wrath 2, a VR game in which Ptah is one of gods
