= Head of Nefertem =

Wooden bust of Tutankhamun

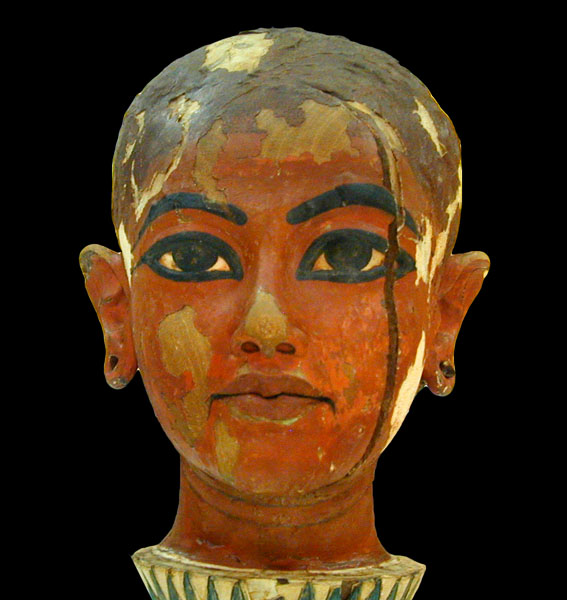
- Head emerging from a lotus
- Material: wood, stucco, paint
- Size: 30 cm high
- Created: 18th Dynasty, New Kingdom
- Discovered: Tomb of Tutankhamun (KV62), Valley of the Kings.
- Present location: Egyptian Museum
- Identification: JE 60723

The Head of Nefertem (also known as the Head from the Lotus Bloom or Tutankhamun as the Sun God) was found in the tomb of Tutankhamun (KV62) in the Valley of the Kings in West Thebes. It depicts the King (Pharaoh) as a child and dates from the 18th Dynasty (New Kingdom). The object received the find number of 8 and today is displayed with the inventory number JE 60723 in the Egyptian Museum in Cairo.

== Discovery ==
The discovery of the Head of Nefertem is controversial, since Howard Carter did not document the piece in his excavation journal. The Head was found in 1924 by Pierre Lacau and Rex Engelbach in KV4 (the tomb of Ramses XI), which was used as a storehouse for the excavation efforts, among the bottles in a box of red wine. At this time, Carter was not in Egypt on account of the strike and closure of Tutankhamun's tomb and the withdrawal or cancellation of the excavation license of Lord Carnarvon's widow Almina, Lady Carnarvon. When later questioned, Carter stated that he had found the head among the rubble in the entry corridor of KV62. In his first season of excavations, the head was not mentioned; at the time Carter only noted partially broken and full-standing alabaster vessels and vases of painted clay in the entrance-way. There is not even photographic documentation of the head in the excavation journal as there is for other pieces found in the tomb. These facts not only led to further disputes in the study of Egyptian antiquities, but also aroused the suspicion in some quarters to this day that Carter had attempted to steal the head.

== Description ==
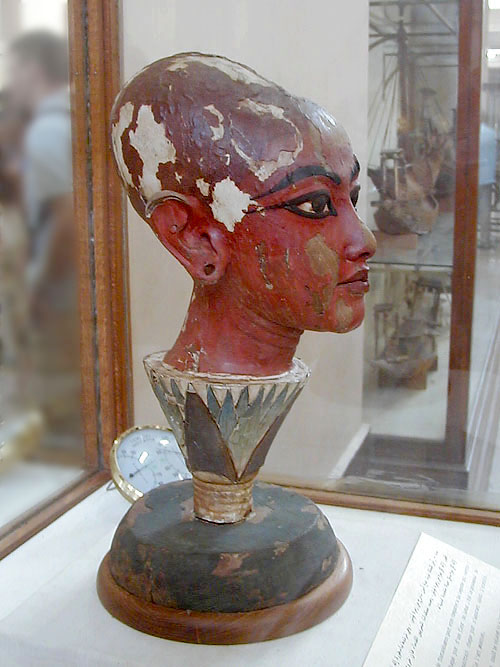
Tutankhamun as Nefertem emerging from a blue lotus bloom, Egyptian Museum, Cairo

The partially damaged head of Nefertem is carved out of wood and is 30 centimetres (12 in) high. The stucco coating is painted red, though large sections have been damaged; Carter attributed this to its seizure by Egyptian authorities in 1924. The eyebrows, the typically Egyptian kohl eye liner, and the pupils of the bust were painted in dark blue. The head of the king is completely shaved, but shaven stubble in the form of black paint is visible. The head has Tutankhamun's facial features and depicts him as a child. As on his golden deathmask, Tutankhamun's ears are pierced.

Of all the artefacts found to date, this head is the only depiction of him as a child.

== Significance ==
The sculpture depicts the Pharaoh in the guise of Nefertem, the god of the dawning sun. The child-god Nefertem springs from a blue lotus, which was associated with the revival of the Sun in the morning because its buds close at night and reopen at dawn. The blue base of the bust symbolises the primordial waters from which the sun rose at the beginning of creation. The Pharaoh was closely associated with the Sun, but the depiction of him in the guise of this particular solar deity was meant to magically guarantee that the Pharaoh would be reborn once more, just as the Sun is reborn at dawn.

== In Egyptian art ==
Like the depictions of the daughters of Akhenaten and Nefertiti found at Tell el-Amarna, the head of Nefertem has the elongated head and neck wrinkles typical of Amarna art. This suggests that the creation of the head occurred during the Amarna period. The depiction of the king as a child is among the most beautiful of all Egyptian art from the end of the 18th Dynasty. The head of Nefertem has been exhibited in travelling exhibitions of selected original finds from the tomb of Tutankhamun, including, among others, the Treasures of Tutankhamun (1972–1981).

== Bibliography ==
- Zahi Hawass. The Head of Nefertem. (= King Tutankhamun. The Treasures Of The Tomb.) Thames & Hudson, London 2007, ISBN 978-0-500-05151-1, p. 16.
- Thomas Hoving. Tutankhamun: The Untold Story. 1980. Rowman & Littlefield (reprint, 2002). ISBN 9780815411864.
- T. G. H. James. Tutankhamun. White Star, 2000, ISBN 9788880954514. Metro Books, 2002, ISBN 9781586637422.
- Peter Munro. "Tutanchamun als Sonnengott." In the exhibition catalogue Tutanchamun in Köln. von Zabern, Mainz 1980, ISBN 3-8053-0438-2, pp. 140–141.
- M. V. Seton-Williams: Tutanchamun. Der Pharao. Das Grab. Der Goldschatz. Ebeling, Luxembourg 1980, ISBN 3-8105-1706-2, p. 120.
