= Maahes =

Ancient Egyptian god

- God of war, protection, and the weather.
- Maahes, with the head of a lion wearing two Uraei while holding knives.
Name in hieroglyphs
mA ir H z zA mAi
- Major cult center: Taremu & Per-Bast
- Symbol: The lion, a knife or sword.

Genealogy
- Parents: Ptah & Bastet or Sekhmet
- Siblings: Nefertem (either full or half depending on the mother)

Maahes (also spelled in Greek: Maches, Michos, Miysis, Mios, and Maeches) (Greek: Μαχές, Μιχός, Μίυσις, Μίος, or Μάιχες) was an ancient Egyptian lion-headed god of war, whose name means "he who is true beside her". He was seen as the son of the Creator god Ptah, as well as the feline goddess (Bast in Lower Egypt or Sekhmet in Upper Egypt) whose nature he shared. Maahes was a deity associated with war, protection, and weather, as well as that of knives, lotuses, and devouring captives. His cult was centred in Taremu and Per-Bast, the cult centres of Sekhmet and Bast respectively.

== Name ==
The name of Maahes begins with the hieroglyphs for the male lion, although in isolation it also means (one who can) see in front. Some of the titles of Maahes were Lord of Slaughter, Wielder of the Knife, and The Scarlet Lord.

== Origin ==
The first recorded reference to Maahes is from the New Kingdom. Some Egyptologists have suggested that Maahes was of foreign origin; indeed there is some evidence that he may have been identical with the lion-god Apedemak worshipped in Nubia and Egypt's Western Desert.

Maahes was considered the son of Ra with the feline goddess Bastet, or of another feline goddess, Sekhmet. He was sometimes identified with another son of Sekhmet, Nefertum. Maahes was said to fight Ra's archenemy, the serpent Apep, during Ra's nightly voyage.

Considered to have powerful attributes, feline deities were associated with the pharaohs, and became patrons of Egypt. The male lion hieroglyph was used in words such as "prince", "strength", and "power".

== Depictions ==
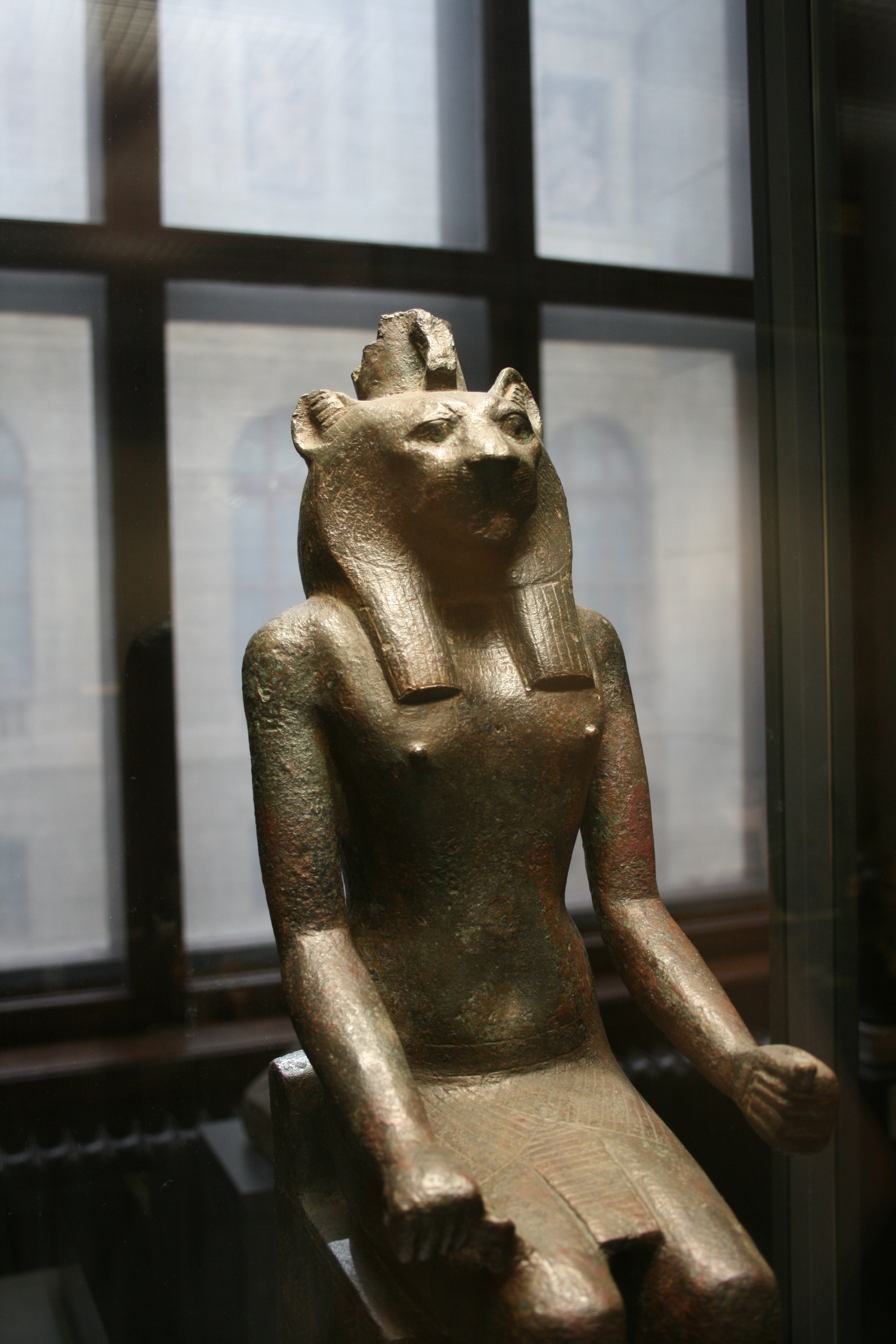
Representation of Maahes (664–525 B.C.) with a lionhead in the Natural History Museum of Vienna

Maahes was pictured as a man with the head of a male lion, sometimes holding a knife and a bouquet of lotus flowers, referring to his connection with Nefertum, who was symbolized by the lotus.

== Sacred animals ==
Tame lions were kept in a temple dedicated to Maahes in Taremu, where Bast/Sekhmet were worshipped, his temple was adjacent to that of Bast. The ancient Greek historian Aelian wrote: "In Egypt, they worship lions, and there is a city called after them. (...) The lions have temples and numerous spaces in which to roam; the flesh of oxen is supplied to them daily (...) and the lions eat to the accompaniment of song in the Egyptian language", thus the Greek name of the city Leontopolis was derived.

== See also ==
- List of Egyptian deities
- Kangla Sha
- Nongshaba
- Sekhmet
- Apedemak
