= Sekhmet =

Ancient Egyptian goddess

- Goddess of war, destruction, and healing
- Sekhmet with head of lioness and a sun disk and uraeus on her head
Name in hieroglyphs
S42 Aa1 t B1
- Major cult center: Memphis, Leontopolis
- Symbol: Sun disk, red linen, lioness
- Parents: Ra (or self-created in Memphis)
- Consort: Ptah
- Offspring: Nefertem, Maahes, Imhotep (later accounts)

In Egyptian mythology, Sekhmet (/ˈsɛkˌmɛt/ or Sachmis /ˈsækmɪs/, from Ancient Egyptian: 𓌂𓐍𓏏𓁐, romanized: Saḫmat; Coptic: Ⲥⲁⲭⲙⲓ, romanized: Sakhmi) is a warrior goddess as well as goddess of medicine.

Sekhmet is also a solar deity, sometimes given the epithet "the eye of Ra". She is often associated with the goddesses Hathor and Bastet.

== Roles ==
Sekhmet is the daughter of the sun god, Ra, and is among the more important of the goddesses in the Egyptian Pantheon. Sekhmet acted as the vengeful manifestation of Ra's power, the Eye of Ra. Sekhmet is said to breathe fire, and the hot winds of the desert were likened to her breath. She is also believed to cause plagues (which were described as being her servants or messengers), although she is also called upon to ward off disease and heal the sick.

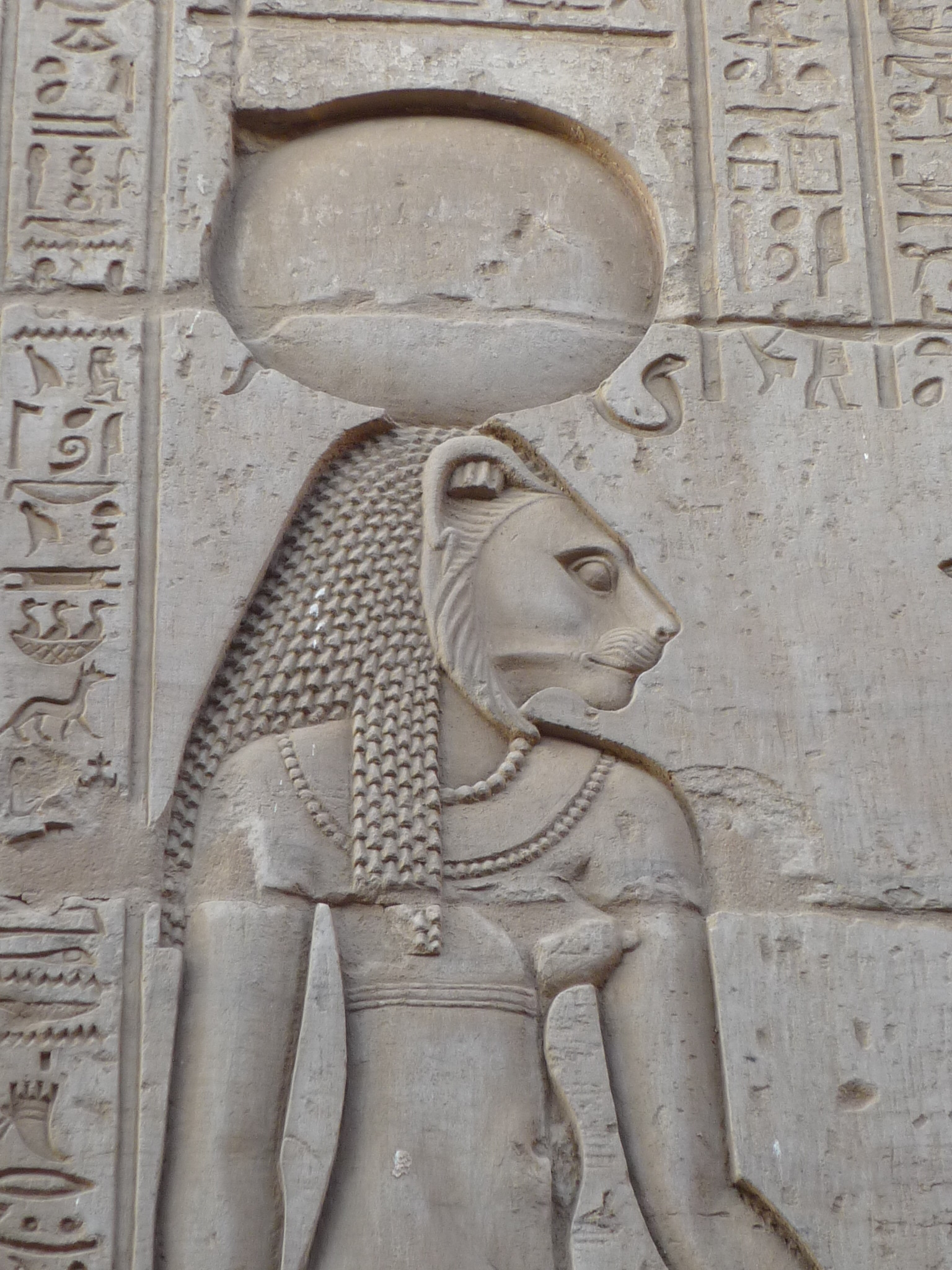
Wall relief of Sekhmet, Temple of Kom Ombo

In a myth about the end of Ra's rule on the earth, Ra sends the goddess Hathor, in the form of Sekhmet, to destroy mortals who conspired against him. In the myth, Sekhmet's bloodlust was not quenched at the end of battle, and this led to her going on a bloody rampage that laid Egypt to waste and almost destroyed all of humanity. To stop her, Ra and the other gods devised a plan. They poured out a lake of beer dyed with red ochre so that it resembled blood. Mistaking the beer for blood, Sekhmet drank it all and became so drunk that she gave up on the slaughter and returned peacefully to Ra. The same myth was also described in the prognosis texts of the Calendar of Lucky and Unlucky Days of Papyrus Cairo 86637.

In other versions of this story, Sekhmet grew angered at the deception and left Egypt, diminishing the power of the sun. This threatened the power and security of the world; thus, she was persuaded by the god Thoth to return and restore the sun to its full glory. Sekhmet's feline attributes and her iconography sometimes make it difficult to differentiate Sekhmet from other feline goddesses – mainly Bastet.

Sekhmet was considered the wife of the god Ptah and mother of his son Nefertum. She was also said to be the mother of the lion-headed war god, Maahes. She was also considered to be the sister of the cat goddess Bastet. The lion-headed goddess Sekhmet is the most represented deity in most Egyptian collections worldwide. Many amulets depict her image, and her numerous statues abound in Egyptian art. Many of her statues can be found in museums and archaeological sites, and her presence testifies to this goddess's historical and cultural importance.

== Worship ==
During an annual festival held at the beginning of the year, a festival of intoxication, the Egyptians danced and played music to soothe the wildness of the goddess and drank great quantities of beer and wine ritually to imitate the extreme drunkenness that stopped the wrath of the goddess—when she almost destroyed humanity.

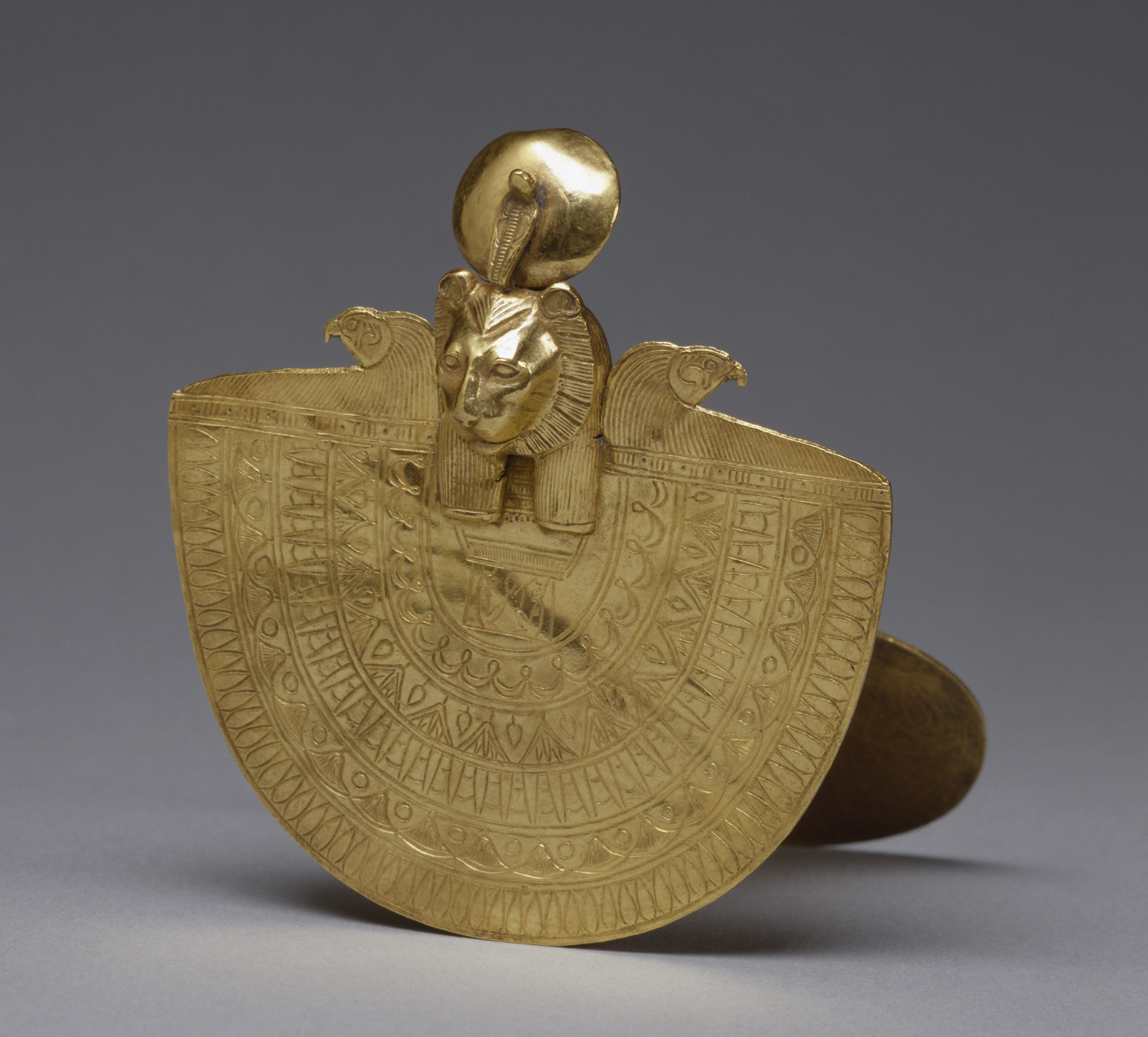
This golden cultic object is called an aegis. It is devoted to Sekhmet, highlighting her solar attributes. Walters Art Museum, Baltimore.

In 2006, Betsy Bryan, an archaeologist with Johns Hopkins University excavating at the temple of Mut in Luxor (Thebes) presented her findings about the festival that included illustrations of the priestesses being served to excess and its adverse effects on them being ministered to by temple attendants. Participation in the festival was great, including by the priestesses and the population. Historical records of tens of thousands attending the festival exist. These findings were made in the temple of Mut because when Thebes rose to greater prominence Mut absorbed some characteristics of Sekhmet. These temple excavations at Luxor discovered a "porch of drunkenness" built onto the temple by the Pharaoh Hatshepsut during the height of her twenty-year reign.

During the Greek dominance in Egypt, note was made of a temple for Maahes that was an auxiliary facility to a large temple to Sekhmet at Taremu in the Delta region, a city which the Greeks called Leontopolis.

== History ==
The first known unambiguous reference to Sekhmet has been found in the mortuary complex of Nyuserre Ini of the Fifth Dynasty of Egypt. She seems to have been a comparatively minor figure in the old kingdom, becoming much more significant in the new kingdom. Around 700 (but perhaps significantly more) statues of Sekhmet were constructed for the Mortuary Temple of Amenhotep III during the New kingdom.

Sekhmet is worshipped by some modern pagans particularly those who follow Goddess spirituality. The worship may involve modern statues of Sekhmet but also of those in museum collections.

== Comparative scholarship ==
In the 1960s it has been argued that the Hindu goddess Kālī, who is first attested in the 7th century CE, shares some characteristics with some ancient Near Eastern goddesses, such as wearing a necklace of heads and a belt of severed hands like Anat, and drinking blood like the Egyptian goddess Sekhmet and that therefore that her character might have been influenced by them. A myth describes how Kali became ecstatic with the joy of battle and slaughter while killing demons, and refused to stop until she was pacified by her consort, Shiva, who threw himself under her feet.

Marvin H. Pope wrote in 1977 that this myth exhibits parallels to the Egyptian myth in which Sekhmet was sent by Ra to destroy the humans plotting against him only to become so captured by her blood-lust that she would not stop despite Ra himself becoming distressed and wishing an end to the killing, only to be stopped by a ruse whereby a plain was flooded with beer which had been dyed red, which Sekhmet mistook for blood and drank until she became too inebriated to continue killing, thus saving humanity from destruction.

== See also ==
- Mafdet – Ancient Egyptian goddess of protection against snakes and scorpions
- List of solar deities
- List of war deities
- List of health deities

== Bibliography ==
- Germond, Philippe (1981). Sekhmet et la protection du monde (in French). Editions de Belles-Lettres.
- Hoenes, Sigrid-Eike (1978). Untersuchungen zu Wesen und Kult der Göttin Sachmet (in German). R. Habelt Verlag.
- Pope, Marvin H.; Röllig, Wolfgang [in German] (1965). "Syrien: Die Mythologie der Ugariter und Phönizier" [Syria: The Mythology of the Ugarites and Phoenicians]. In Haussig, Hans Wilhelm [in German] (ed.). Götter und Mythen im Vorderen Orient [Gods and Myths in the Middle East] (in German). Stuttgart, Germany: Ernst Klett Verlag. pp. 217–312.
- Loprieno, Antonio (1995). Ancient Egyptian: A Linguistic Introduction. Cambridge, United Kingdom; New York City, United States: Cambridge University Press. ISBN 978-0-521-44384-5.
- Pope, Marvin H. (1977). Song of Songs. The Anchor Bible. Vol. 7C. New York City, United States: Doubleday. ISBN 978-0-385-00569-2.
- von Känel, Frédérique (1984). Les prêtres-ouâb de Sekhmet et les conjurateurs de Serket (in French). Presses Universitaires de France.
- Vycichl, Werner (1983). Dictionnaire Étymologique de la Langue Copte [Etymological Dictionary of the Coptic Language] (in French). Leuven, Belgium: Peeters Publishers. ISBN 978-2-801-70197-3.
