= Kommos (Crete) =

Archaeological site in Southern Crete, Greece

- Κομμός (Greek)
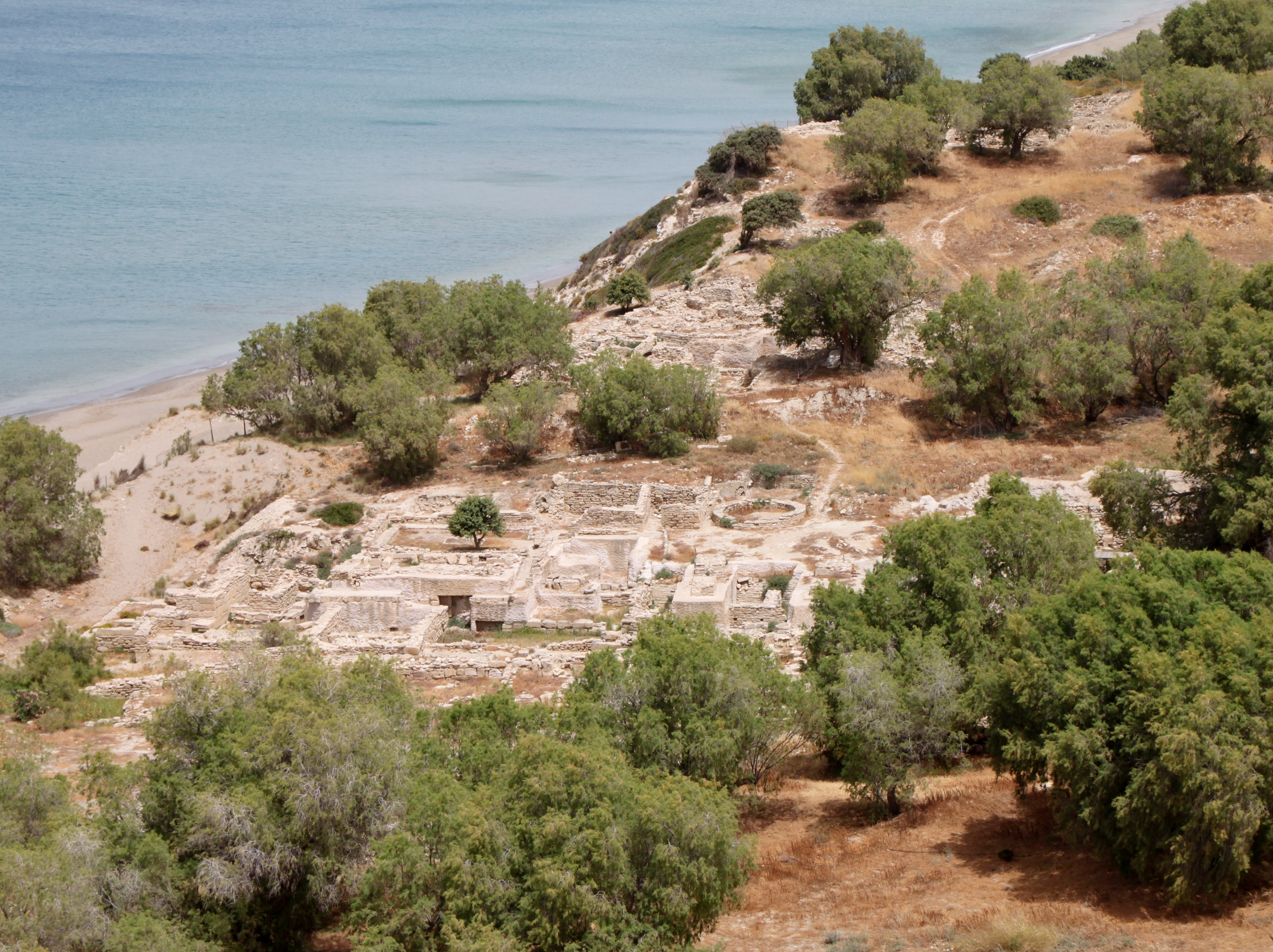
- Archaeological site of Kommos

- Kommos Kommos (Crete) (Greece)
- 35.013333°N 24.760962°E
- Type: Harbour town, sanctuary
- Cultures: Minoan civilization, Mycenaean civilization, Ancient Greece
- Satellite of: Possibly Phaistos and Hagia Triada
- Region: Mesara Plain, Crete

Site notes
- Excavation dates: 1976-1995
- Archaeologists: Joseph Shaw, Maria Shaw
- Public access: No

Kommos (Greek: Κομμός) is an archaeological site in southern Crete. During the Minoan period, it served as a harbour town for nearby Phaistos and Hagia Triada. After the Bronze Age, a sanctuary was built over the ruins of the earlier town. It is notable for providing evidence about international trade and local daily life.

The partially excavated site is located 5 km north of Matala, adjacent to Kommos Beach. It is not open to the public, but is visible from the beach.

== Site description ==
Kommos is located on the coast of the Mesara Plain, one of the major population centers of the Minoan civilization. It is near the Palace of Phaistos and the town of Hagia Triada, with whom it has been described as forming "a great Minoan triangle". The archaeological site is next to Kommos Beach, a popular swimming spot. In ancient times, Papadoplaka reef islet would have partly sheltered the town from waves and wind, though it has been substantially submerged by rising sea levels and German bombing during the Nazi occupation of Crete.

The Minoan city was divided into two areas, demarcated by a broad road paved with stone slabs. The hilly northern sector was primarily a residential neighborhood, while civic buildings were constructed in the lower and flatter southern area. The site is stratigraphically complex, with remains from different periods often directly on top of each other.

=== Palace-style buildings ===
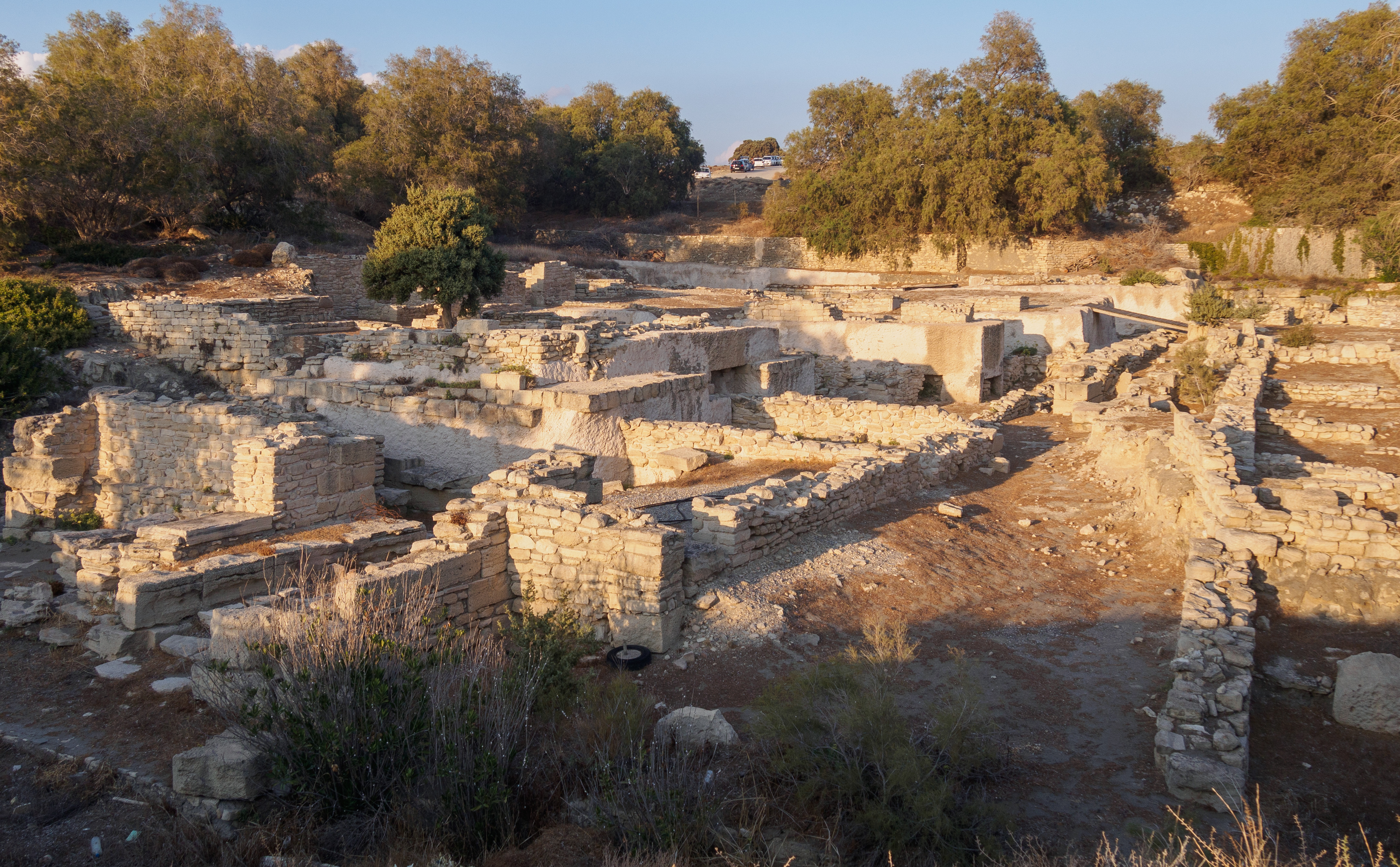
The north side of the palatial complex contains intermingled remains from various eras.

The southern edge of the site is notable for its architectural parallels with Minoan palaces. Like the palaces, this area had a paved rectangular court surrounded by monumental wings. Because Kommos is thought to have been politically dependent on Phaistos and Hagia Triada, the presence of palatial architecture is a puzzle. In the words of excavator Joseph Shaw:

Could a relatively small and architecturally unpretentious town such as Kommos have promoted and maintained such an enormous structure, or have we misunderstood the palaces? Perhaps they were not so rare nor served such large regions as is generally supposed. Or perhaps in T we see an adaptation of the palace form for commercial purposes.

The palatial complex was rebuilt several times. The earliest known palatial building, Building AA, was constructed shortly after the first palace at Phaistos during MMII. However, an earlier walkway excavated under AA's central court suggests that it may have had a precedecessor. During MMIII, Building AA was replaced by the grandiose Building T, comparable in size to the palace at Phaistos, with a facade constructed from the largest ashlars used by the Minoans. These ashlar blocks are called "orthostats" Because they are large narrow slabs set on their edge. After an earthquake, the area was left in ruins before being redeveloped in the LMIIIA2 period. Buildings from this phase include the court-centered Building N and Building P. In this period, a pottery workshop including a kiln was built in the earlier court, which has provided archaeologists with crucial evidence regarding Minoan pottery production. The kiln was erected in a stoa of which six limestone bases for wooden columns were visible that bordered the courtyard of Building T on its south side. The kiln was erected after Building T's collapse, which leads archeologists to the idea that Building T lost its prestigious role and a kiln was built in its place.

=== Ship sheds ===
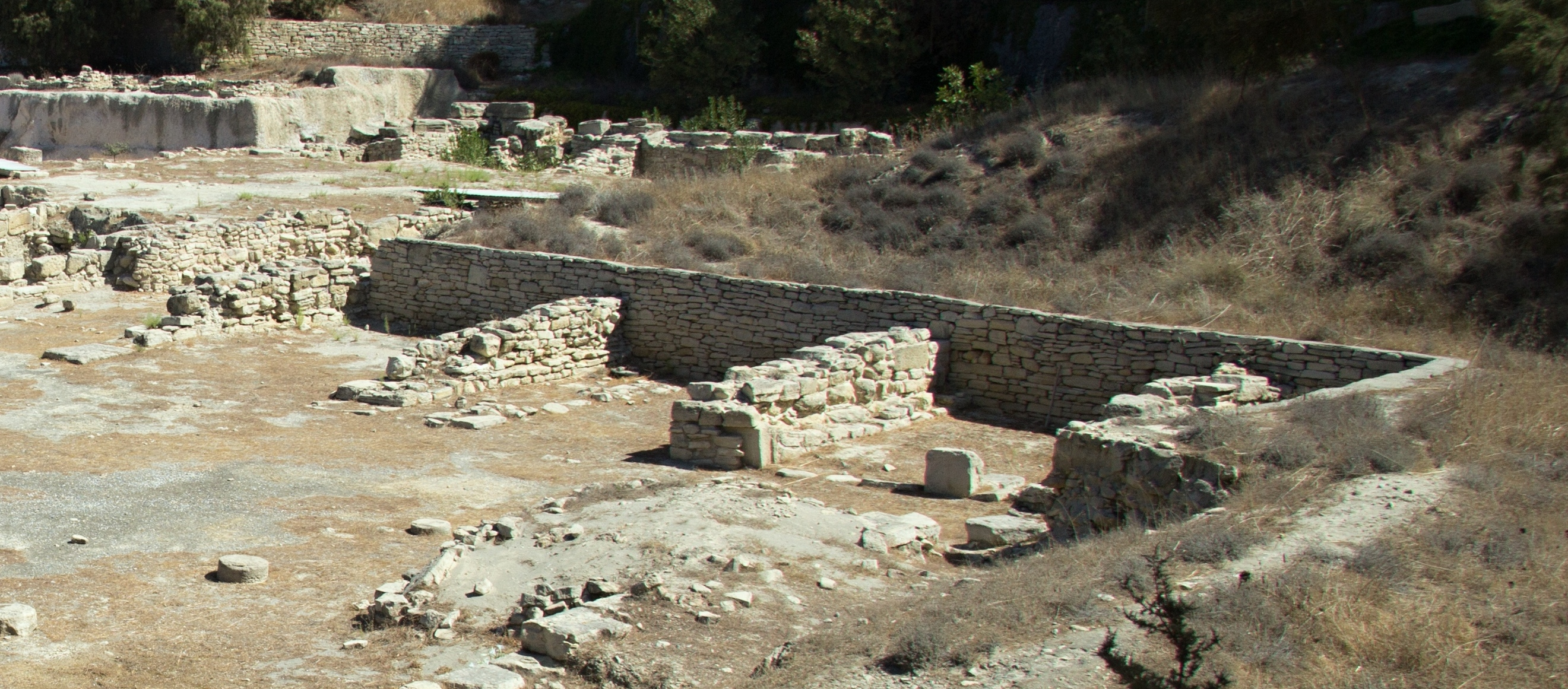
Building P is believed to have been used to store ships during the non-sailing season.

The LMIIIA Building P has been described as "perhaps the most curious" building at the site. Consisting of six long narrow galleries, its layout resembles Minoan storerooms. However, the galleries were open on their western sides, suggesting that their contents were left unsecured. Particularly since the open side faces the sea, the building is standardly interpreted as an early example of a ship shed. However, unlike Classical-era buildings of this sort, Building P was not on the shoreline and lacked a slipway. Thus, archaeologists hypothesize that the building was used for longer term storage than later examples. This interpretation is bolstered by the discovery of residue from hematite anti-fouling paint in the building as well as a comparable structure at Knossos's port of Katsamba.

Building P was built over the ruins of Building T's eastern wing. It is the largest known Minoan building from the LMIIIA era and easily distinguishable at the site today. It is also notable for being the location where the vast majority of "short necked amphoras" were found.

=== Post-Bronze Age sanctuary ===
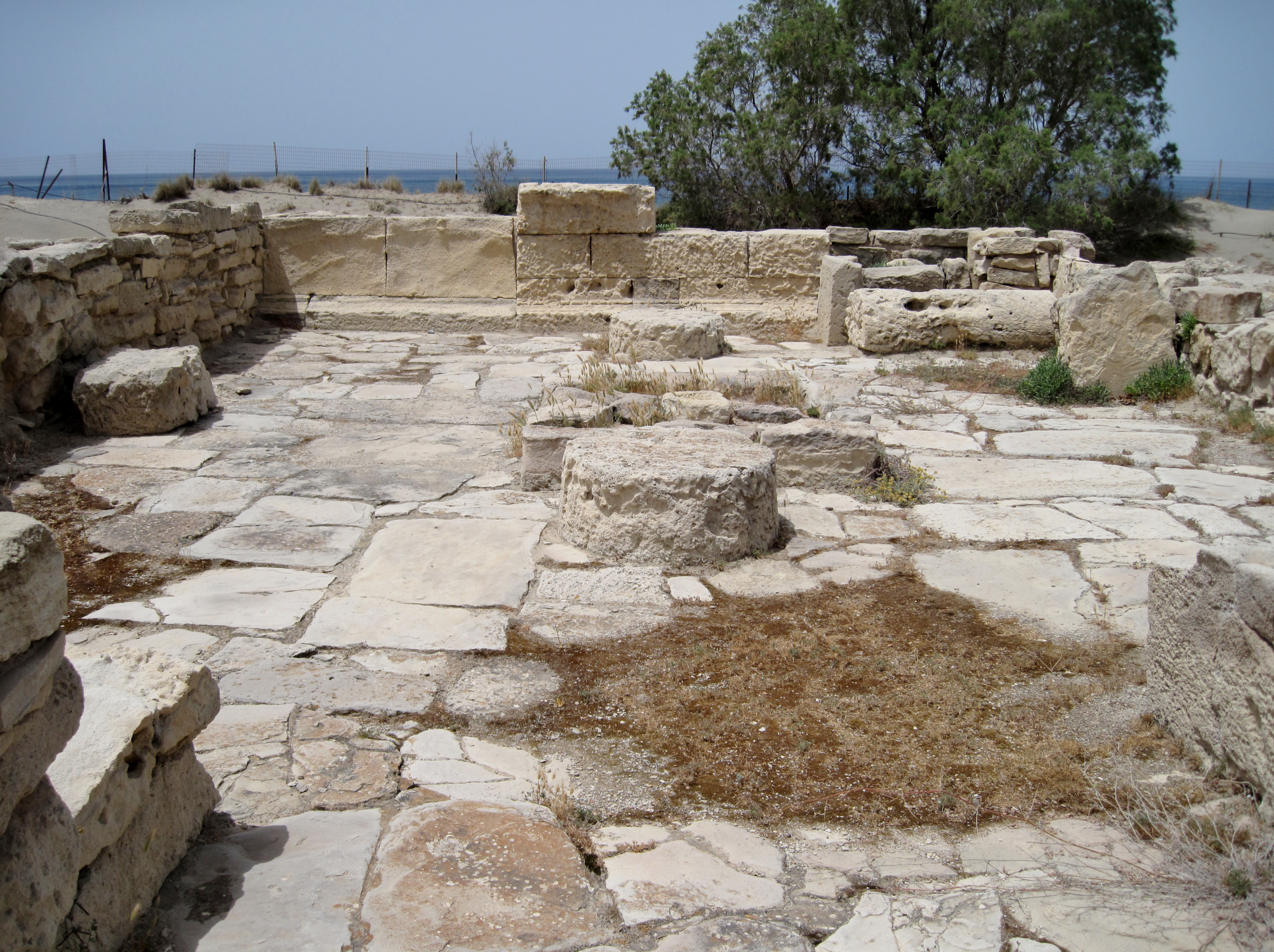
Temple C was a Classical Greek temple.

Later ruins at the site include a sequence of temples, which were excavated along with copious votives and evidence of ritual feasting. The earliest of them, Temple A, was a simple rural shrine built in the Subminoan period around 1020 BC at the then-abandoned site. It was replaced by Temple B in the Archaic era around 800 BC. At this point in time, Kommos was once again a stopping point for sailors, and finds from Temple B attest to its international connections. The temple included a Phoenician tripillar shrine around which were found imported faience figurines of the Egyptian gods Sekhmet and Nefertum. This temple was abandoned around 600 BC, a time of reduced religious activity throughout Crete.

The latest temple, Temple C, was built in the Classical era around 400 BC it remained in use until around 150 AD. A more ambitious construction, this building consisted of a single rectangular room and was typical of Cretan temples in its lack of exterior columns. The temple originally had two statues, though all that remains of them are the statue bases and one eye, leaving the identity of the gods worshipped there uncertain.

To the east of Temple C lies the Kommos Sanctuary where four altars were erected. These altars were erected at different points in the sanctuary's development. The earliest, Altar H, was erected around the latter half of the 6th century BC. The later three altars were erected during the period of Temple C. It is unknown if the erection of different altars represents the worship of different deities in different periods. However, the inscription at the site mention the Gods, Zeus, Athena and Poseidon.

== History ==
The site was first settled in the Late Neolithic, but only expanded into a major settlement during the Middle Minoan period. In this era, the site expanded to cover an area of roughly 1.5 ha, and monumental buildings were built for the first time in the flat southern part of the site. After an earthquake in the MMIII/LMI period, the site was rebuilt on a larger scale, perhaps 3.5 ha. Archaeologists have noted that during the early LMIII period, residents' living standards fell even as commercial activity reached its all time peak. The site was abandoned after LMIIIB around 1200 BC and was never reoccupied on the same scale, though it served as a sanctuary until the Hellenistic era.

The Minoan name of the town is unknown, but it has been argued that the site corresponds to Classical Era Amyklaion (Greek: Αμύκλαιον), which would reflect a link with Amyclae. Robin Lane Fox speculates that it is referred to in Odyssey 3.296: "a small rock holds back the great waves." That small rock is likely to have been the natural reef of Papadoplaka and a submerged sandy shore stretching to the coast would have formed a natural harbor.

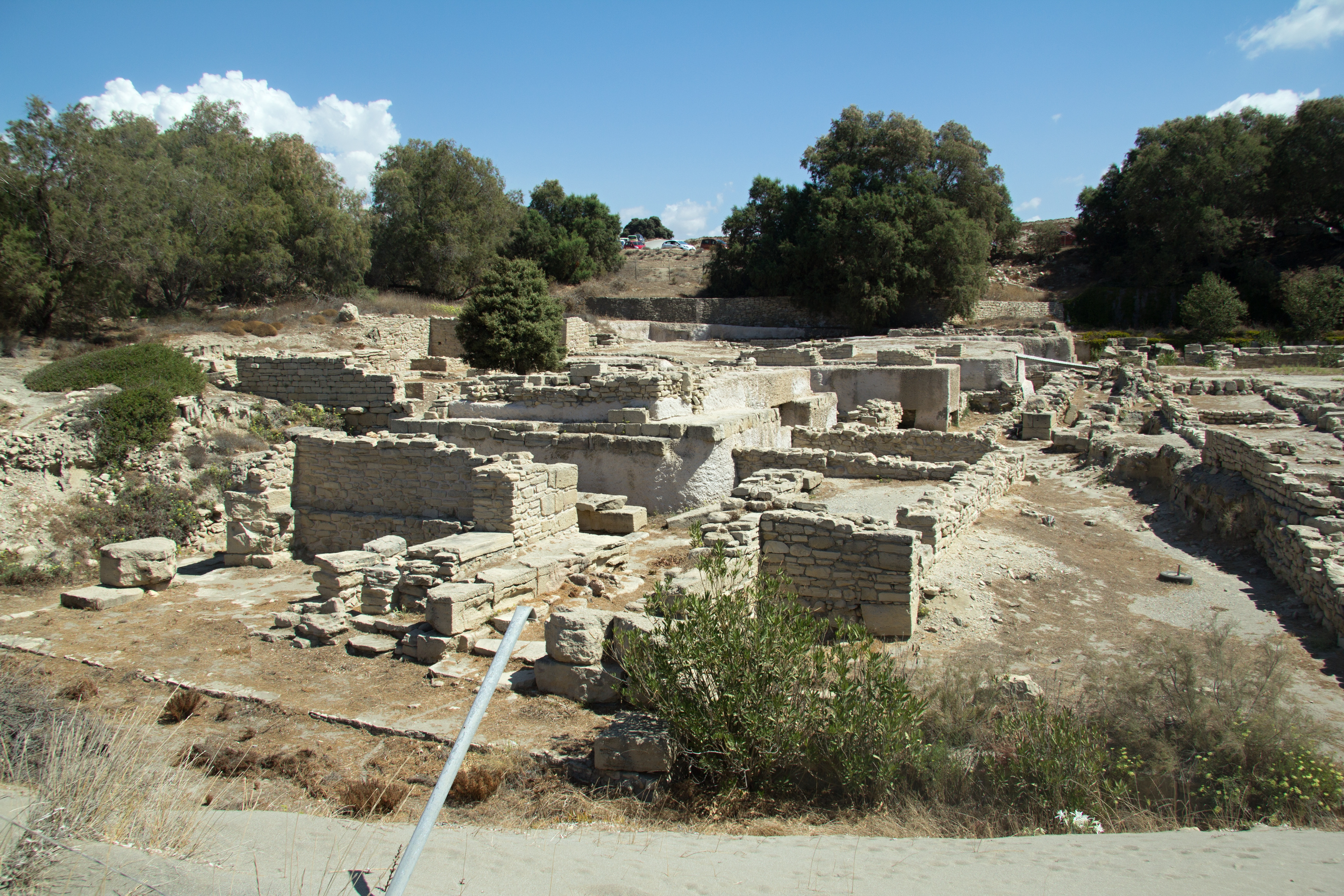
The site

== Ancient flora and fauna ==
The site has yielded many animal remains, a majority of which were excavated from archaic vessels and pottery.

Excavations carried out between 1976 and 1985 yielded 9,400 large mammal bones, 150 Rodentia bones, 1,150 fish bones, and around 36,000 marine invertebrate. Of these samples a large number were attributed to pigs. Remains found revealed a variety of butchery methods performed, including partial opening of the skull assumedly for consumption of the brain. Further animal remains, such as cows and deer were also found around the site. Very few human remains have been uncovered from the site, with the only human remain being an adult mandible.

Bird remains have also been found. Eggshells and avian bones from the site were identified by Dr. George E. Watson, Curator of Birds at the Smithsonian Institution. The usage for birds varied from domestication to consumption. Avian bones found at the site include Woodpigeon, Rock Dove, Turtle Dove, Scopoli's Shearwater, and Chukar Partridge.

== Evidence of Trade ==
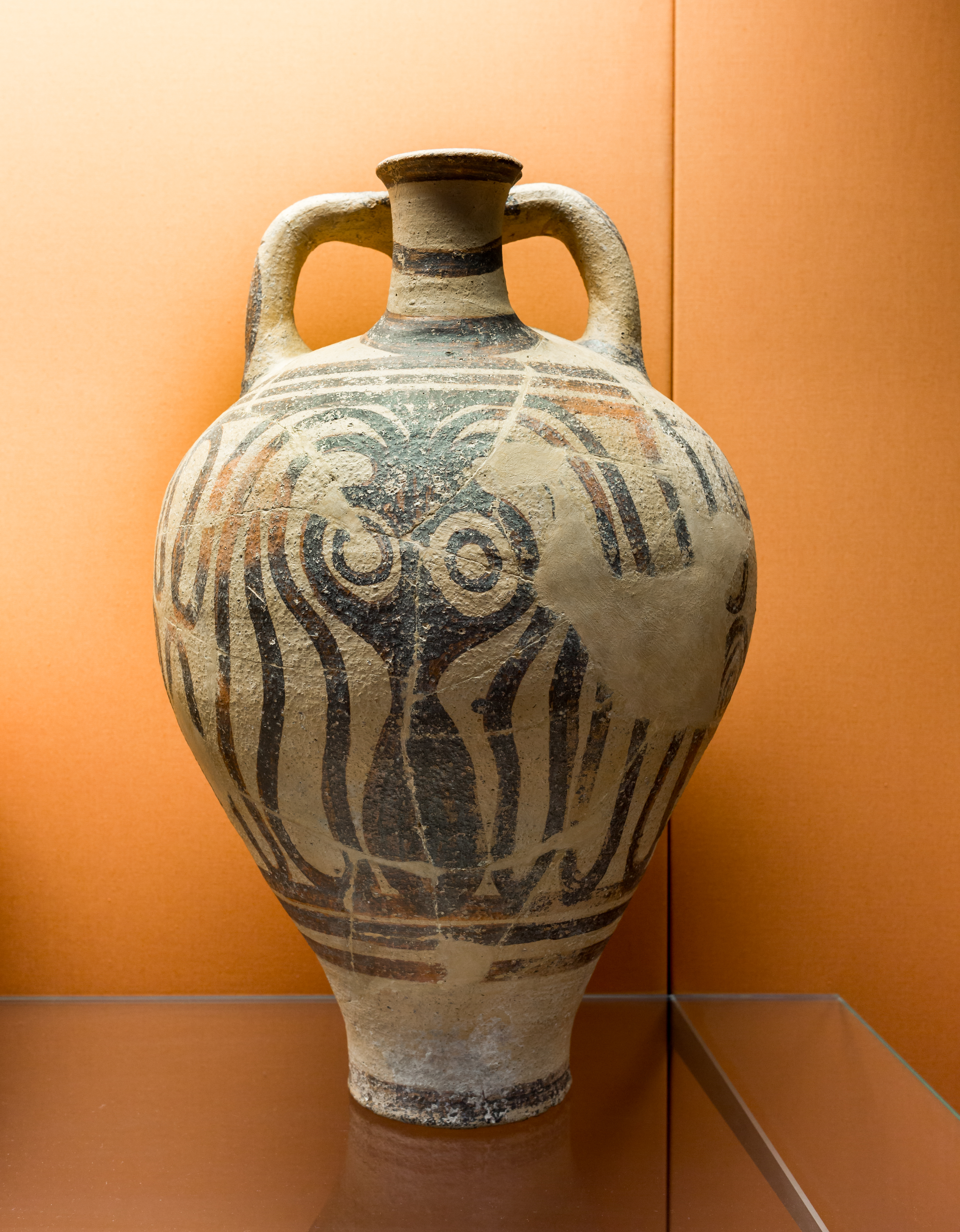
Minoan pottery stirrup-jar decorated with an octopus, 1300-1200 BC (LM IIIb). Found in Tomb 50, Kourion, Cyprus. British Museum, GR 1896.2-1.265. BM Cat Vases C501

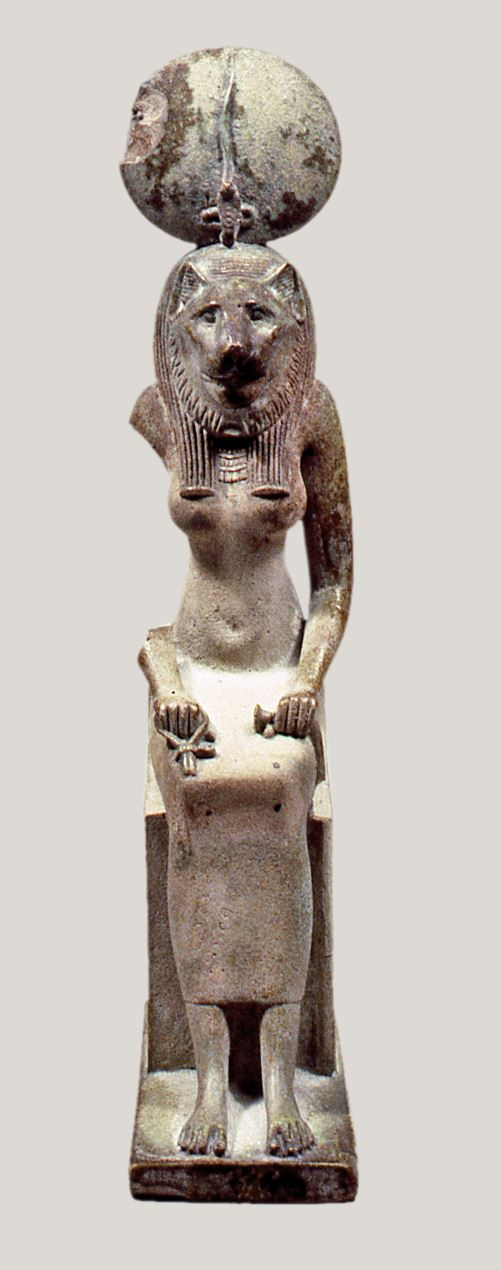
Statuette of the goddess Sekhmet, made of Egyptian faience found in Egypt, similar to the figurine found in Kommos. Museo Egizio, Turin.

Kommos has yielded more evidence for intercultural trade in the form of imported ceramics than any other Bronze Age site in the Aegean. Archaeologists have found Egyptian figurines such as a small faience figurine dedicated to the Egyptian Goddess Sekhmet, deposited at Temple B. They also found terracotta animal figurines as well as, transport jars, Canaanite jars, and jars that originated from the Nile Delta. The typical transport vessel found in the Late Bronze Age Southern Aegean is the transport stirrup-jar. The Stirrup-jar is a closed vessel with a tapering cylindrical neck rendered false by a clay disk cap. the jar has been alternatively called, "pseudostomos amphoreas," or, "false neck jar." The Jar was used primarily to transport liquid produce from the Aegean to the Mediterranean. At the beginning of the 14th century BC, a variation of the Minoan oval-mouthed amphora started making an appearance in Kommos. Dubbed the short-neck amphora, this vessel had two cylindrical handles attached at the shoulder, a stunted neck, and a round mouth. On the Syro-Palestinian coast, the Canaanite jar was the preferred transport jar; it was widely exported to Cyprus and Lower Egypt, where they eventually adopted and imitated the shoulder-handled vessel. The variations of the Canaanite jar created in Egypt can easily be identified by the diversities in material and surface treatment.

Thousands of ceramic sherds have been recovered from the Late Minoan city of Kommos. Transport stirrup jars have not only been found on Crete but also in vast quantities on the Greek mainland, throughout the Aegean Islands, and along the western Anatolian coast. The Cretan vessels have been found in the Egyptian city of Tell el-Amarna, Cyprus, and the Levant, and the results of petrographic and trace element analysis determine that the majority of these transport stirrup jars originated in the northern part of Central Crete. While the transport stirrup jar was frequently used in Crete to ferry their goods, the Canaanite jar was the preferred container throughout the Levant. Evidence of the Canaanite jar has been found at Kommos in the form of 60 fragmentary to fully restorable containers. The final type of vessel identified is the Egyptian jar. Kommos has been the only Aegean site where this Late Bronze Age undecorated pottery has been recovered. The styles of pottery range from closed shapes to amphoras, flasks, and necked jars, and most likely transported wine. The presence of Canaanite jars and Egyptian jars at Kommos and Cretan transport stirrup jars found throughout the Aegean islands, Egypt, and the Anatolian coast confirms the importance of international trade to the Late Minoan coastal city of Kommos.

== Excavation history ==
Kommos first attracted the attention of archaeologists in 1924, when Arthur Evans visited the site. Though he did not excavate, he studied surface remains and proposed that the site had been a Minoan port. Though this conclusion later proved accurate, most of his specific interpretations were not. For instance, the building he identified as a customs house turned out to be an ordinary residence, and a feature he interpreted as a Minoan road was in fact a later fortification wall.

Excavations at the site began in 1976 under the direction of Joseph Shaw from the University of Toronto, who specialized in ancient Mediterranean harbours. Over the previous decade, Shaw had surveyed a number of coastal sites in Mesara, concluding from surface pottery that Kommos alone showed evidence of Minoan presence. At the time, the site was covered by a layer of sand that was four meters deep in some areas. This sand had to be cleared by a front loader before the earth layer below could be excavated. This process was complicated by the site having been a former Nazi minefield which was not entirely mineswept after the war.

Excavations began after a ceremony from a local priest, and quickly confirmed that the site was archaeologically viable. Initial excavations turned up not only the expected Minoan remains, but also Greco-Roman roof tiles, something not expected based on surface pottery. Excavations used then-novel methodologies, attending to topography, geology, land use, and evidence of daily life at the site rather than simply elite material culture. Anticipating that an international port would contain a variety of local and international pottery, the archaeologists set aside a box labeled "The Strange and Wonderful" for stylistically unfamiliar finds. When colleagues from other digs toured the site, they were asked to look through the bin as their "entrance ticket".

== See also ==
- Asterousia Mountains
- Hagia Triada

== Bibliography ==
Joseph W. Shaw, Kommos: A Minoan Harbor Town and Greek Sanctuary in Southern Crete (ASCSA, 2006: ISBN 0-87661-659-7).

- A Bibliographical Guide to the Kommos site by Joseph W. Shaw (pdf; HTML cache)

Peter M. Day, Patrick S. Quinn, Jeremy B. Rutter, & Vassilis Kilikoglou. (2011). A WORLD OF GOODS: Transport Jars and Commodity Exchange at the Late Bronze Age Harbor of Kommos, Crete. Hesperia: The Journal of the American School of Classical Studies at Athens, 80(4), 511–558.

- https://www.jstor.org/stable/10.2972/hesperia.80.4.0511
