= Nefertem =

Ancient Egyptian deity

- the Memphite god Nefertem with a water-lily headdress as a symbol of fragrance and beauty.
Name in hieroglyphs
F35 I9 D21 X1 U15 A40
- Major cult center: Memphis
- Symbol: the water-lily, lion (occasionally)

Genealogy
- Parents: Ptah and Sekhmet or Bast
- Siblings: Maahes (either full or half depending on the mother)

In Egyptian mythology, Nefertem (/ˈnɛfərˌtɛm/; possibly "beautiful one who closes" or "one who does not close"; also spelled Nefertum or Nefer-temu) was a lotus flower at the creation of the world, who had arisen from the primal waters. Nefertem represented both the first sunlight and the delightful smell of the Egyptian blue lotus flower, having arisen from the primal waters within an Egyptian blue water-lily, Nymphaea caerulea. Some of the titles of Nefertem were "He Who is Beautiful" and "Water-Lily of the Sun", and a version of the Book of the Dead says:

Rise like Nefertem from the blue water lily, to the nostrils of Ra (the creator and sungod), and come forth upon the horizon each day.

Nefertem or Nefertum was depicted either as a lion-headed man (left), as a beautiful young man (right)

Nefertem was eventually seen as the son of the creator god Ptah, and the goddesses Sekhmet and Bast were sometimes called his mother. In art, Nefertem is usually depicted as a beautiful young man having blue water-lily flowers around his head. As the son of Bastet, he also sometimes has the head of a lion or is a lion or cat reclining. The ancient Egyptians often carried small statuettes of him as good-luck charms.

One of the most notable depictions of Nefertem is the Head of Nefertem, a wooden bust depicting a young king Tutankhamun as Nefertem with his head emerging from a lotus flower.

== Gallery ==
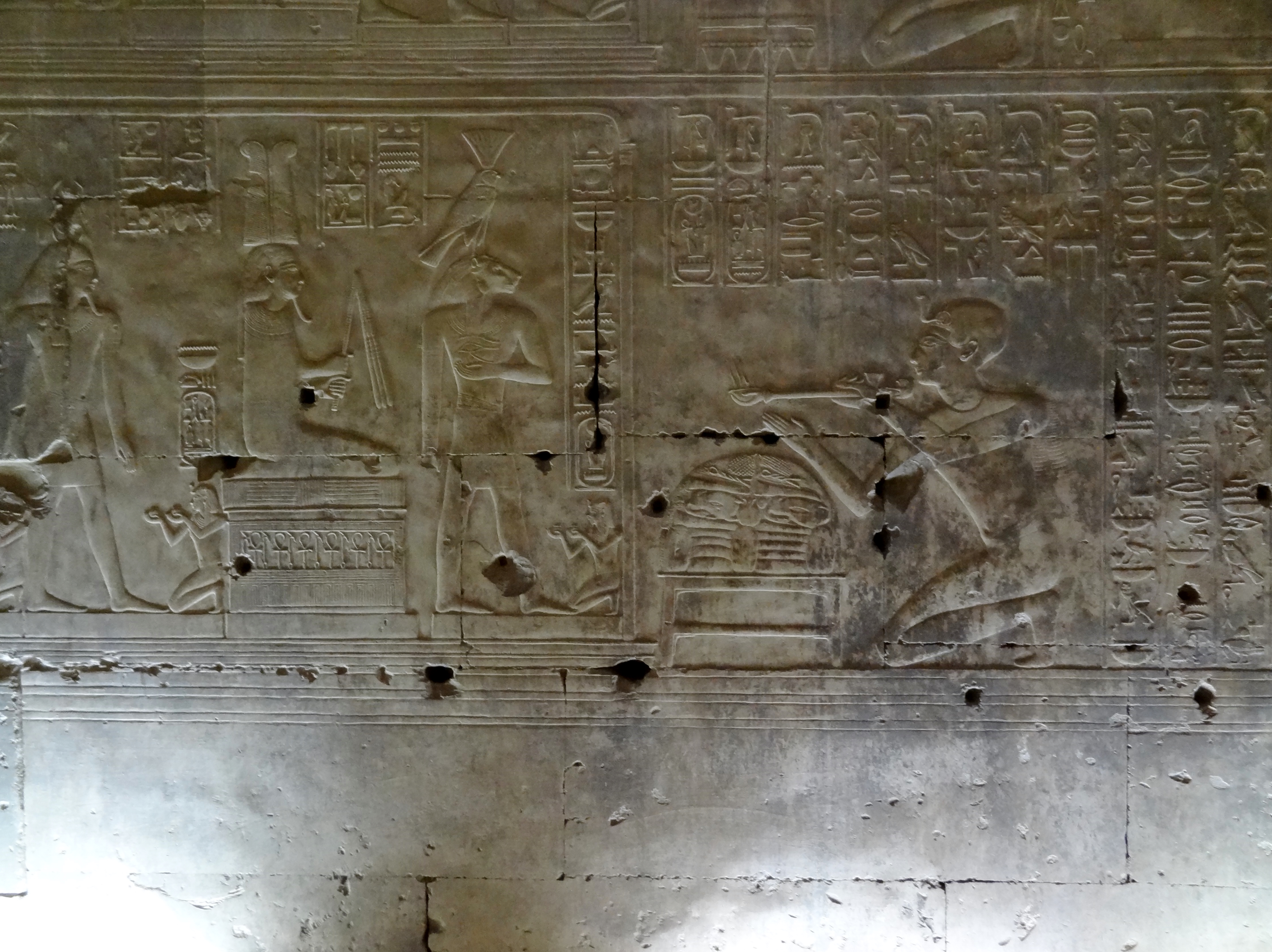
Nefertem (middle left) depicted with the head of a lion with a falcon and lotus atop his head.

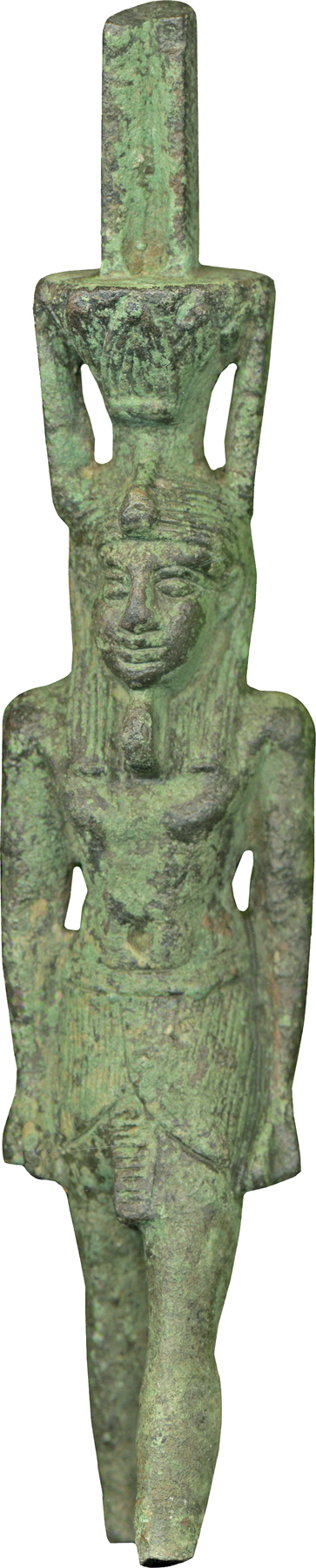
Nefertem, The Walters Art Museum.

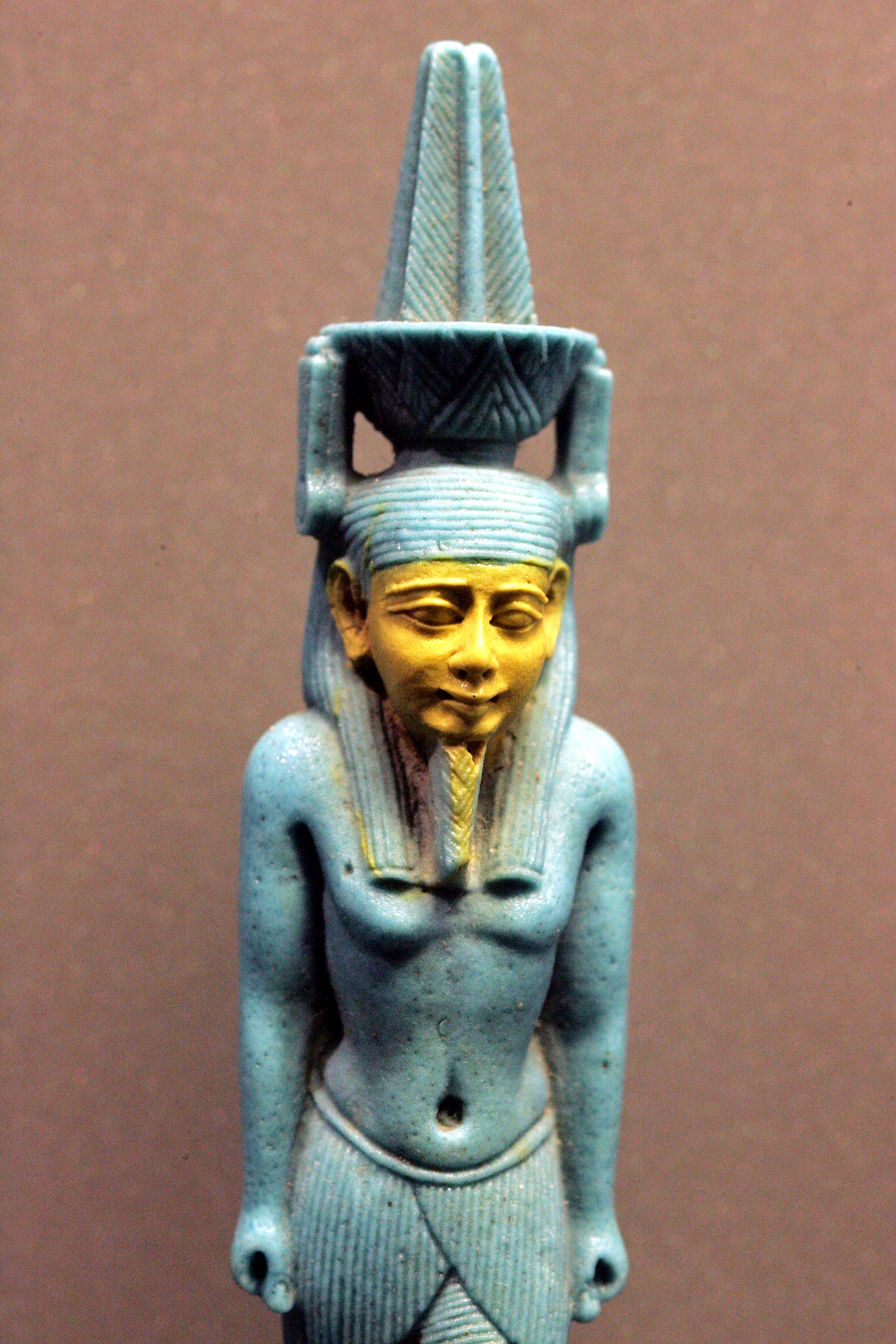
Closeup of a statuette of Nefertem.

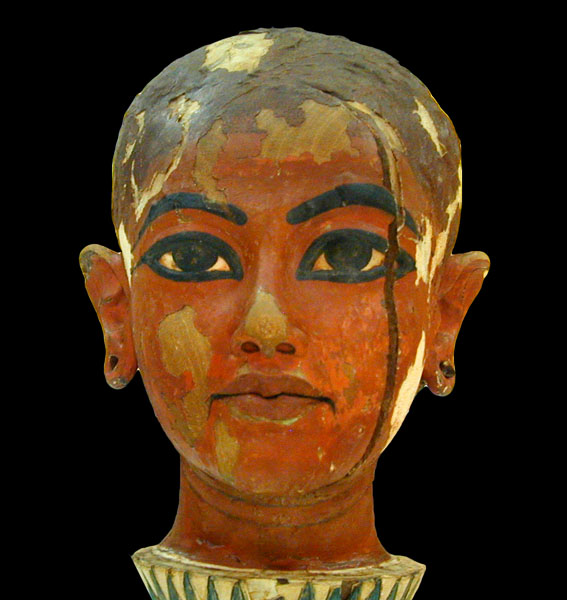
The Head of Nefertem, found in the Tomb of Tutankhamun.

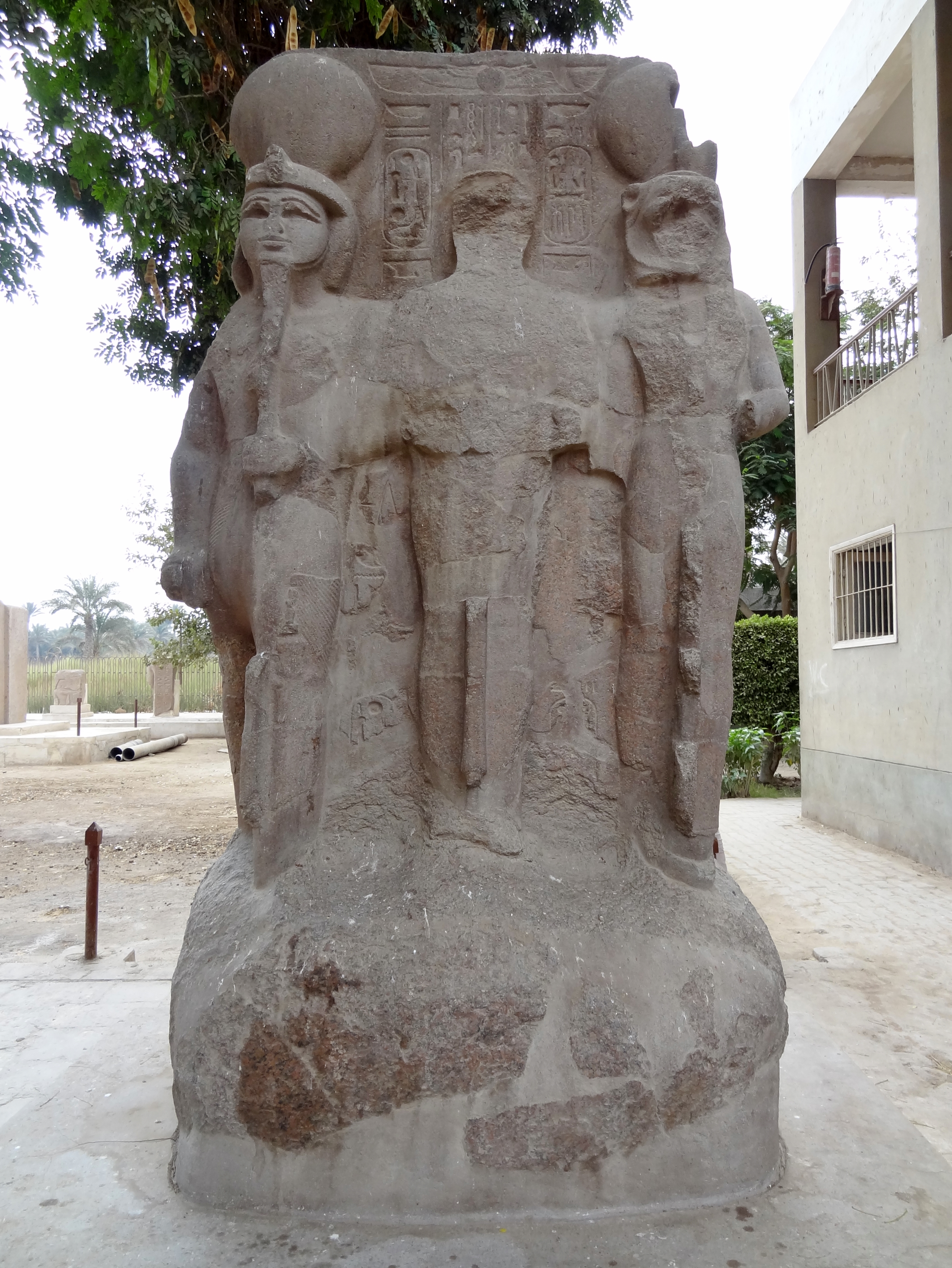
The Colossal Triad of Memphis, with Nefertem depicted standing at Ptah's right and Sekhmet at his left.

The Memphite Triad on a Solar barque including Ptah, Sekhmet, and Nefertem.
