= Papadoplaka =

Natural reef islet off the coast of Crete, Greece

Native name: Παπαδόπλακα
- Location within Greece

Geography
- Coordinates: 35°00′48″N 24°45′24″E
- Archipelago: Cretan Islands

Administration
- Greece
- Region: Crete
- Regional unit: Heraklion

Demographics
- Population: 0 (2001)

Papadoplaka (Greek: Παπαδόπλακα) is a natural reef islet off the southern coast of the Greek island of Crete in the Libyan Sea. The reef is in front of Kommos and close to Gortyn which was the ancient capital of Crete. The name can be loosely translated as the priest's rock. It is administered within Heraklion regional unit.

== Minoan era ==
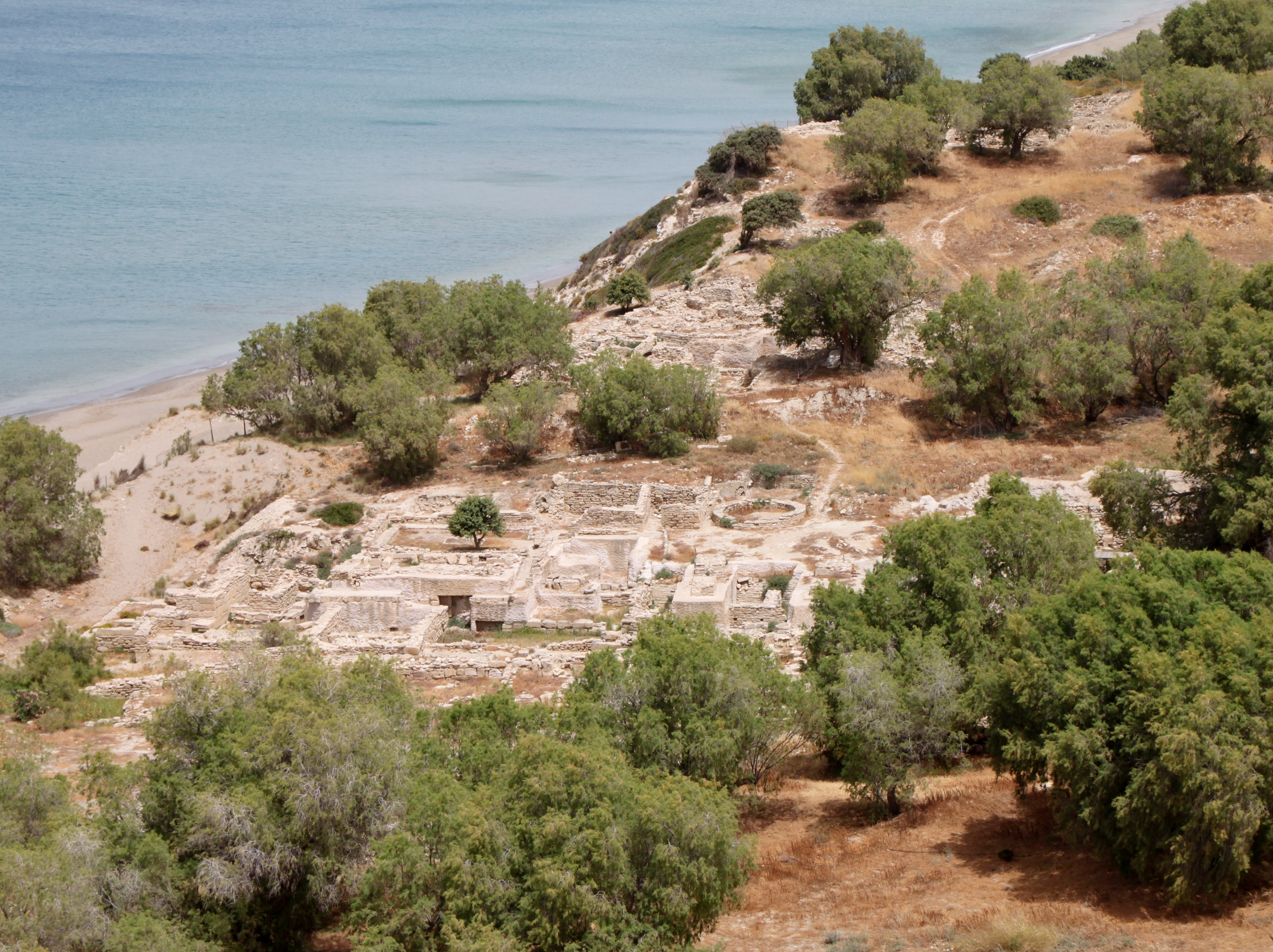
Archaeological site of Kommos

Papadoplaka was more substantial in Minoan times, due to lower sea levels, and is likely to have offered safe harbour for ships in that part of the bay. J. W. Shaw believes that Papadoplaka is likely to have been linked with the coast via a partially submerged sandy shore. This would make a Minoan harbor at Kommos similar to the harbor at Amnisos.
