= Cats in ancient Egypt =

Cat in hieroglyphs
mi i w E13
mjw
𓏇𓇋𓅱𓃠

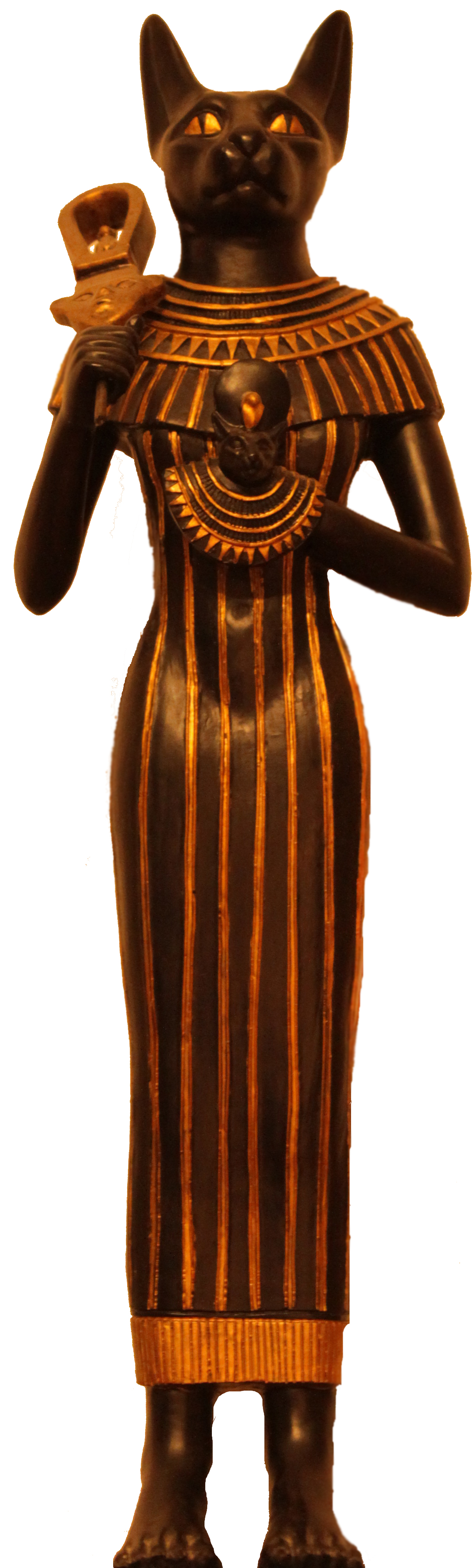
Cat-headed deity Bastet

In ancient Egypt, cats were represented in social and religious scenes dating as early as 1980 BC. Several ancient Egyptian deities were depicted and sculptured with cat-like heads such as Mafdet, Bastet and Sekhmet, representing justice, fertility, and power, respectively. The deity Mut was also depicted as a cat and in the company of a cat.

Cats were praised for killing venomous snakes, rodents and birds that damaged crops, and protecting the Pharaoh since at least the First Dynasty of Egypt. Skeletal remains of cats were found among funerary goods dating to the 12th Dynasty. The protective function of cats is indicated in the Book of the Dead, where a cat represents Ra and the benefits of the sun for life on Earth. Cat-shaped decorations used during the New Kingdom of Egypt indicate that the domesticated cat became more popular in daily life. Cats were depicted in association with the name of Bastet.

Cat cemeteries at the archaeological sites Speos Artemidos, Bubastis, and Saqqara were used for several centuries. They contained vast numbers of cat mummies and cat statues that are exhibited in museum collections worldwide. Among the mummified animals excavated in Giza, the African wildcat (Felis lybica) is the most common cat followed by the jungle cat (Felis chaus). In view of the huge number of cat mummies found in Egypt, the cat was certainly important for the country's economy; it is speculated that cats were bred for the purpose of sacrifice and mummification, requiring a trading network for the supply of food, oils and resins for embalming them.

== History ==
Mafdet was the first known cat-headed deity in ancient Egypt. During the First Dynasty, she was regarded as protector of the pharaoh's chambers against snakes, scorpions and evil. She was often also depicted with a head of a leopard (Panthera pardus) or a cheetah (Acinonyx jubatus). She was particularly prominent during the reign of Den.

The deity Bastet is known from at least the Second Dynasty onwards. At the time, she was depicted with a lion (Panthera leo) head. Seals and stone vessels with her name were found in the tombs of the pharaohs Khafre and Nyuserre Ini, indicating that she was regarded as protector since the mid 30th century BC during the Fourth and Fifth Dynasties. A wall painting in the Fifth Dynasty's burial ground at Saqqara shows a small cat with a collar, suggesting that tamed African wildcats were kept in the pharaonic quarters by the 26th century BC.

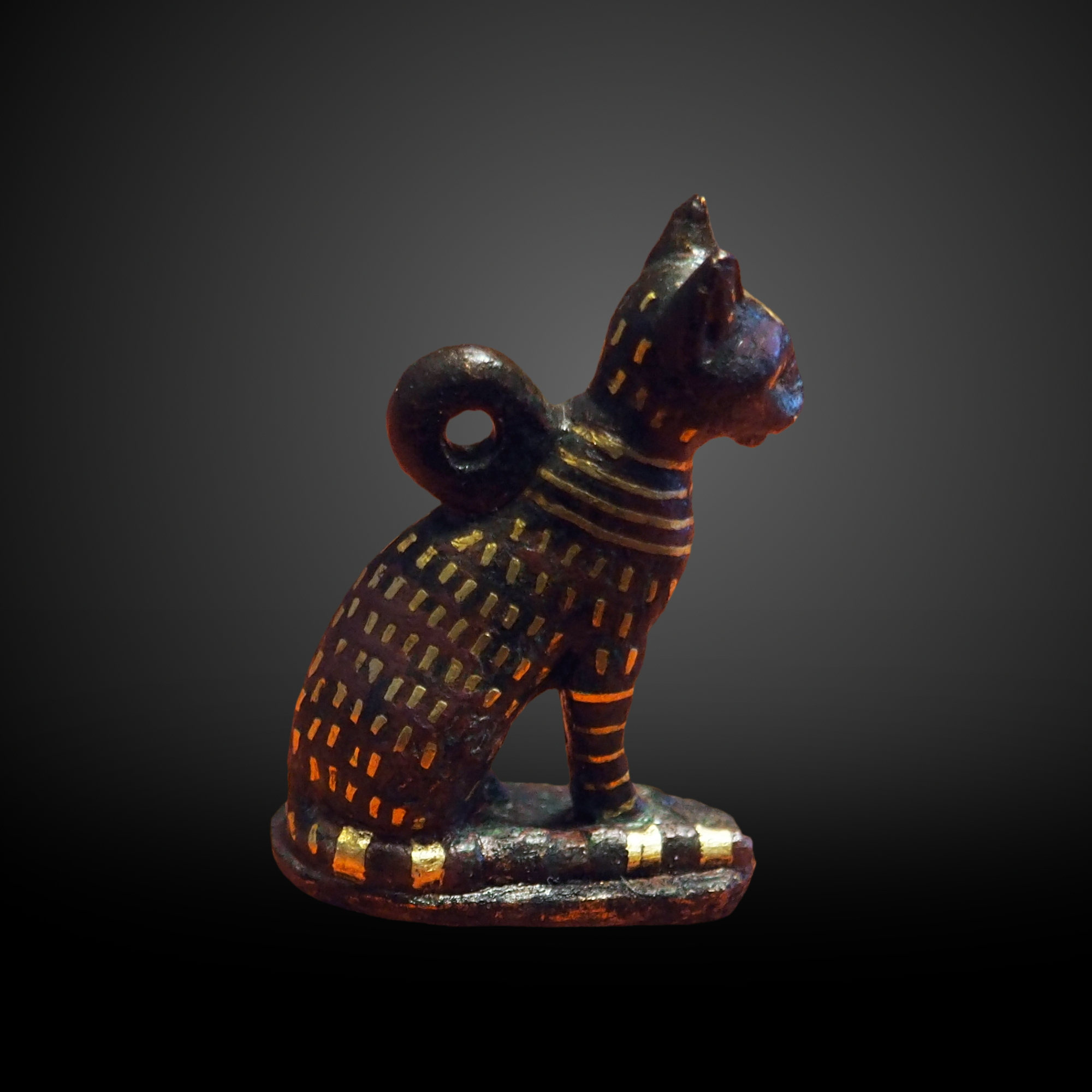
Cat amulet

Amulets with cat heads came into fashion in the 21st century BC during the 11th Dynasty. A mural from this period in the tomb of Baqet III depicts a cat in a hunting scene confronting a rat-like rodent.

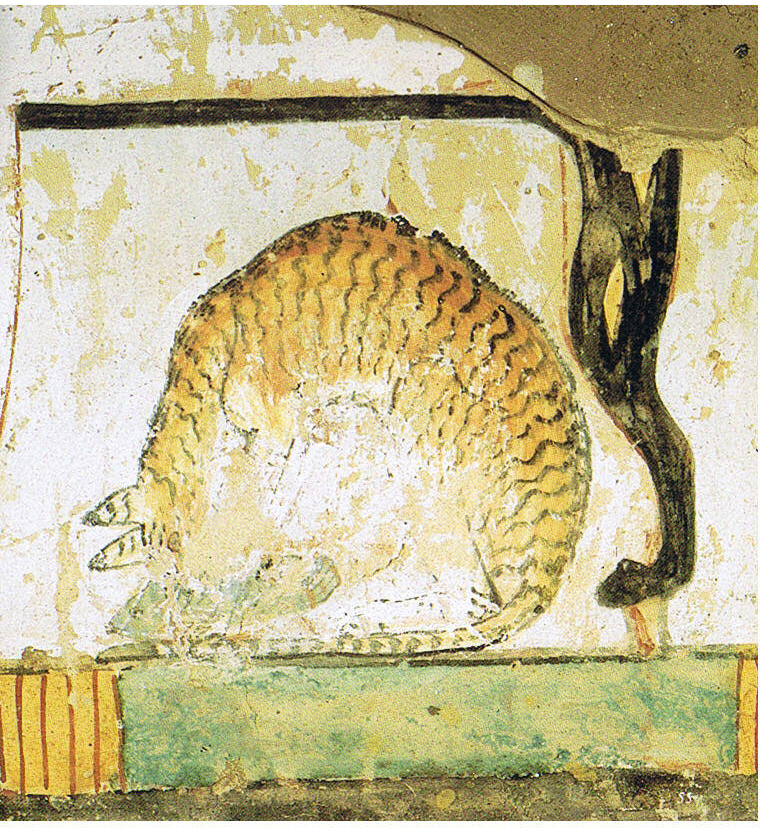
Cat eating a fish under a chair, mural in the tomb of Nakht copied by Norman de Garis Davies

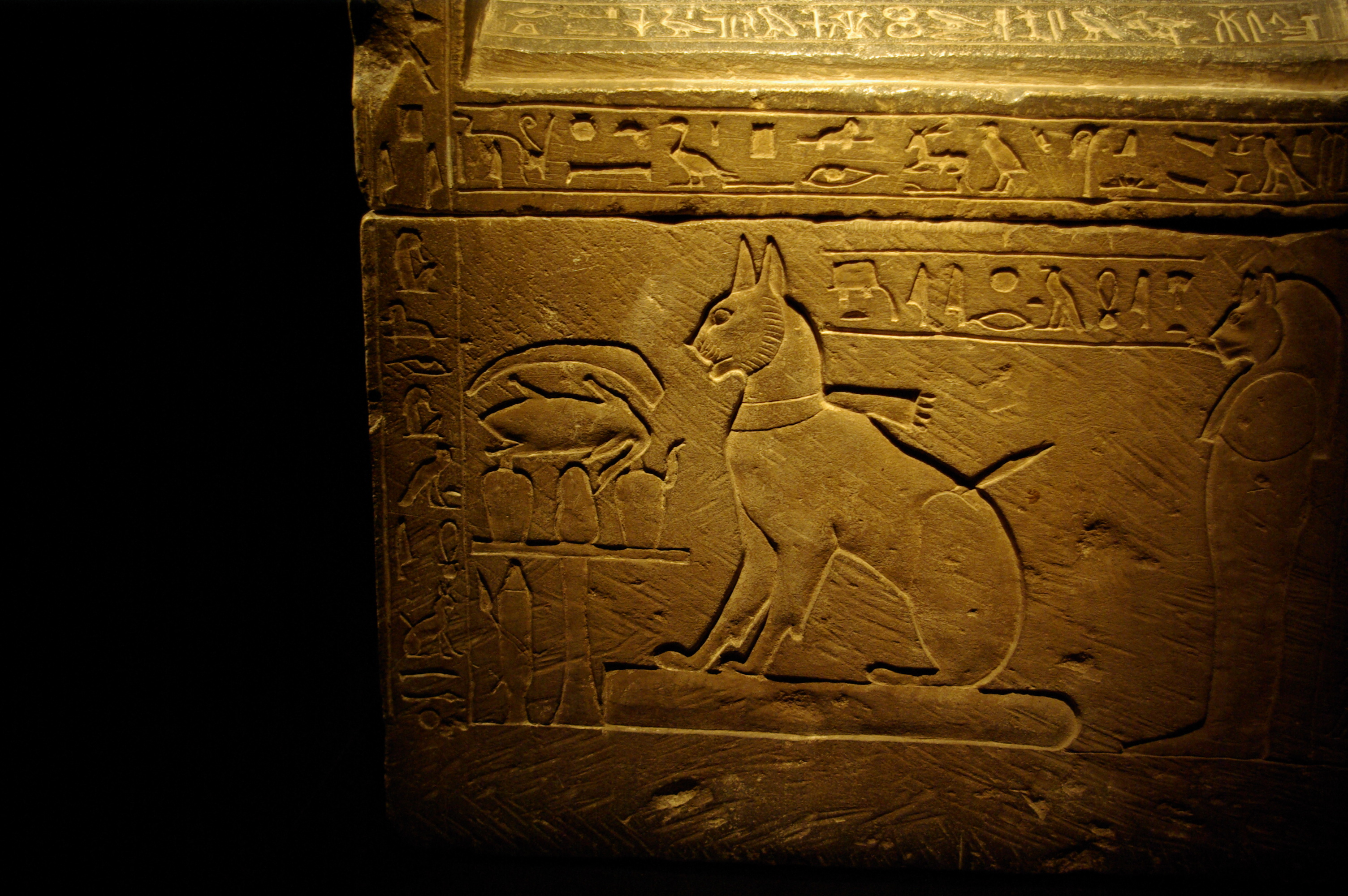
Sarcophagus of Prince Thutmose's cat, exhibited in the Museum of Fine Arts of Valenciennes, France

A tomb at the necropolis Umm El Qa'ab contained 17 cat skeletons dating to the early 20th century BC. Next to the skeletons stood small pots that are thought to have contained milk for the cats. Several tomb murals in the Theban Necropolis show cats in domestic scenes. These tombs belonged to nobles and high-ranking officials of the 18th Dynasty and were built in the 15th and 14th centuries BC. The murals show a cat sitting under a chair during a buffet, eating meat or fish; some show it in the company of a goose or a monkey. A cat in hunting and fowling scenes is another recurring motif in murals of Theban tombs.

The first known indication for the mummification of a cat was found in an elaborately carved limestone sarcophagus dated to about 1350 BC. This cat is assumed to have been Prince Thutmose's beloved pet.

From the 22nd Dynasty at around the mid 950s BC onwards, the deity Bastet and her temple in the city of Bubastis grew in popularity. She was later shown only with a small cat head. Domestic cats (Felis catus) were increasingly worshipped and considered sacred. When they died, they were embalmed, coffined and buried in cat cemeteries. The domestic cat was regarded as living incarnation of Bastet who protects the household against granivores, whereas the lion-headed deity Sekhmet was worshipped as protector of the pharaohs. During the reign of Pharaoh Osorkon II in the 9th century BC, the temple of Bastet was enlarged by a festival hall. Cat statues and statuettes from this period exist in diverse sizes and materials, including solid and hollow cast bronze, alabaster and faïence.

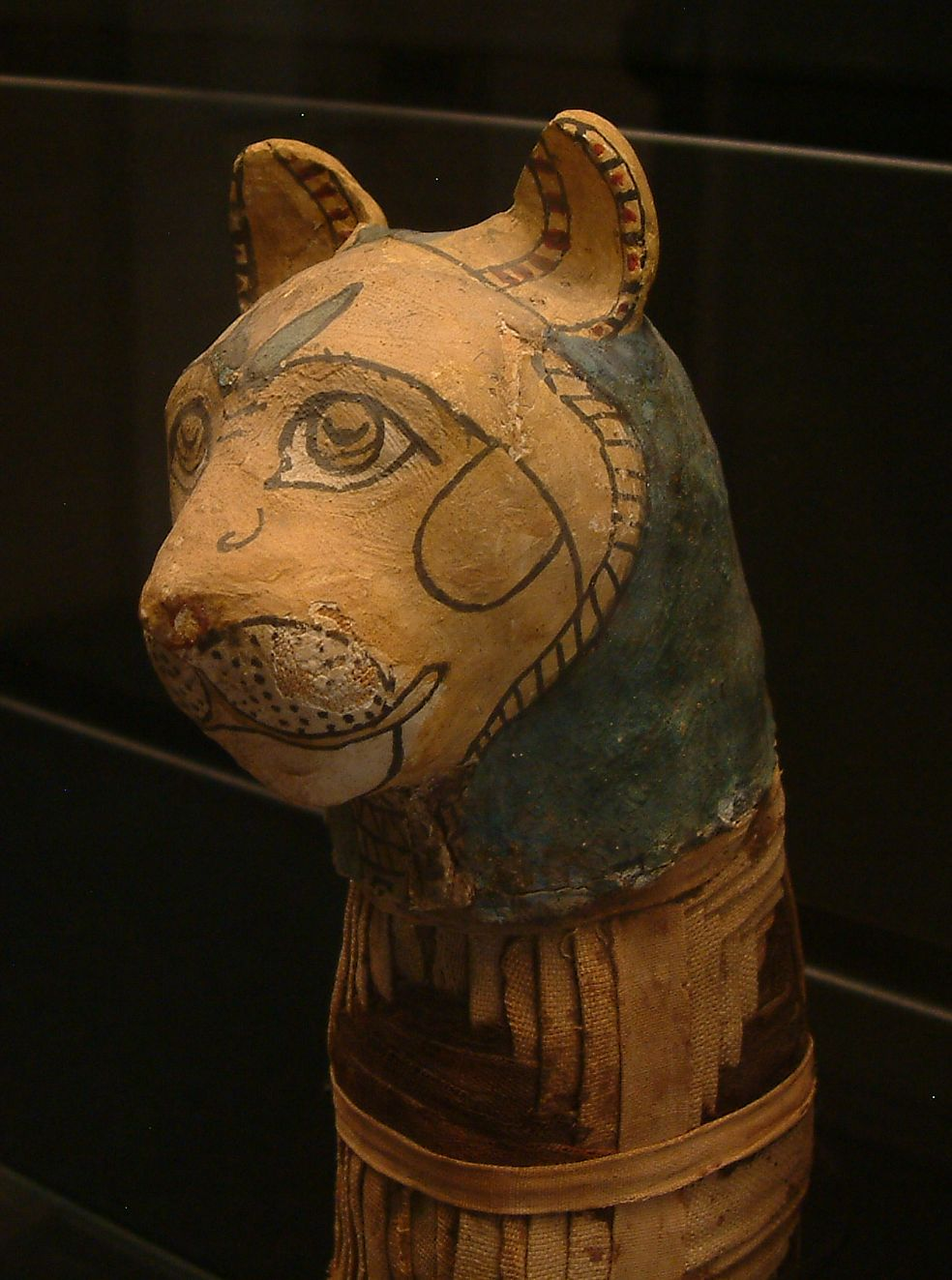
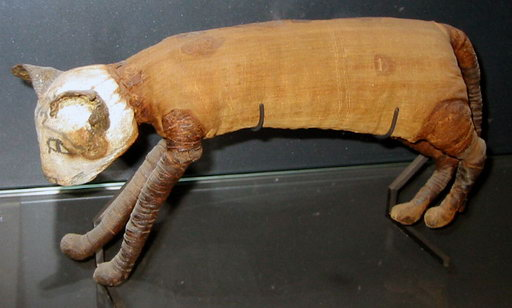
Cat mummies exhibited in the Department of Egyptian Antiquities of the Louvre

Mummifying animals grew in popularity during the Late Period of ancient Egypt from 664 BC onwards. Mummies were used for votive offerings to the associated deity, mostly during festivals or by pilgrims. Catacombs from the New Kingdom period in the Bubastis, Saqqara and Beni Hasan necropoli were reused as cemeteries for mummies offered to Bastet.

In the mid 5th century BC, Herodotus described the annual festival at the Bubastis temple as the largest in the country, attended by several hundred thousand pilgrims.

During the Hellenistic period between 323 and 30 BC, the goddess Isis became associated with Bastet and cats, as indicated by an inscription at the Temple of Edfu: “Isis is the soul of Bastet”. In this period, it is speculated that cats were systematically bred to be killed and to be mummified as sacrifices to the gods.

As described by Diodorus Siculus, killing a cat was regarded as a serious crime. In the years between 60 and 56 BC, outraged people lynched a Roman for killing a cat, although pharaoh Ptolemy XII Auletes tried to intervene.

Cats and religion began to be disassociated after Egypt became a Roman province in 30 BC. A series of decrees and edicts issued by Roman Emperors in the 4th and 5th centuries AD gradually curtailed the practice of paganism and pagan rituals in Egypt. Pagan temples were impounded and sacrifices prohibited by 380 AD. Three edicts issued between 391 and 392 prohibited pagan rituals and burial ceremonies at all cult sites. Death penalty for offenders was introduced in 395, and the destruction of pagan temples decreed in 399. By 415, the Christian church received all property that was formerly dedicated to paganism. Pagans were exiled by 423, and crosses replaced pagan symbols following a decree from 435.

Egypt has since experienced a decline in the veneration once held for cats. They were still respected in the 15th century, when Arnold von Harff travelled to Egypt and observed mamluk warriors treating cats with honour and empathy. Gentle treatment of cats is part of Islamic tradition.

== Expeditions and excavations ==
In 1799, members of the French Commission des Sciences et des Arts surveyed the old city of Lycopolis near Asyut for the first time and found mummified cats and remains of other animals. They also found mummified cats and cat skeletons in the Theban Necropolis. In the 1820s, the Louvre Museum exhibited cat statues made of wood, bronze, and enameled pottery that originated mostly in Bubastis.

In 1830, Christian Gottfried Ehrenberg accounted of having observed three different small cat forms in Egypt: the jungle cat, the African wildcat, and a sacred cat that was intermediate in size between the jungle cat and the domestic cat. He called this cat Felis bubastis.

The Egypt Exploration Society funded excavations in Bubastis in the late 1880s. Édouard Naville accounted of numerous cat statues already available in Cairo shops at the time. At the city's cemetery of cats, he and colleagues emptied several large pits up to a volume of 20 m^{3} (720 cu ft) filled with cat and Egyptian mongoose (Herpestes ichneumon) bones. Among the bones, some embalming material, porcelain and bronze objects, beads and ornaments, and statues of Bastet and Nefertem were also found. By 1889, the cemetery was considered exhausted.

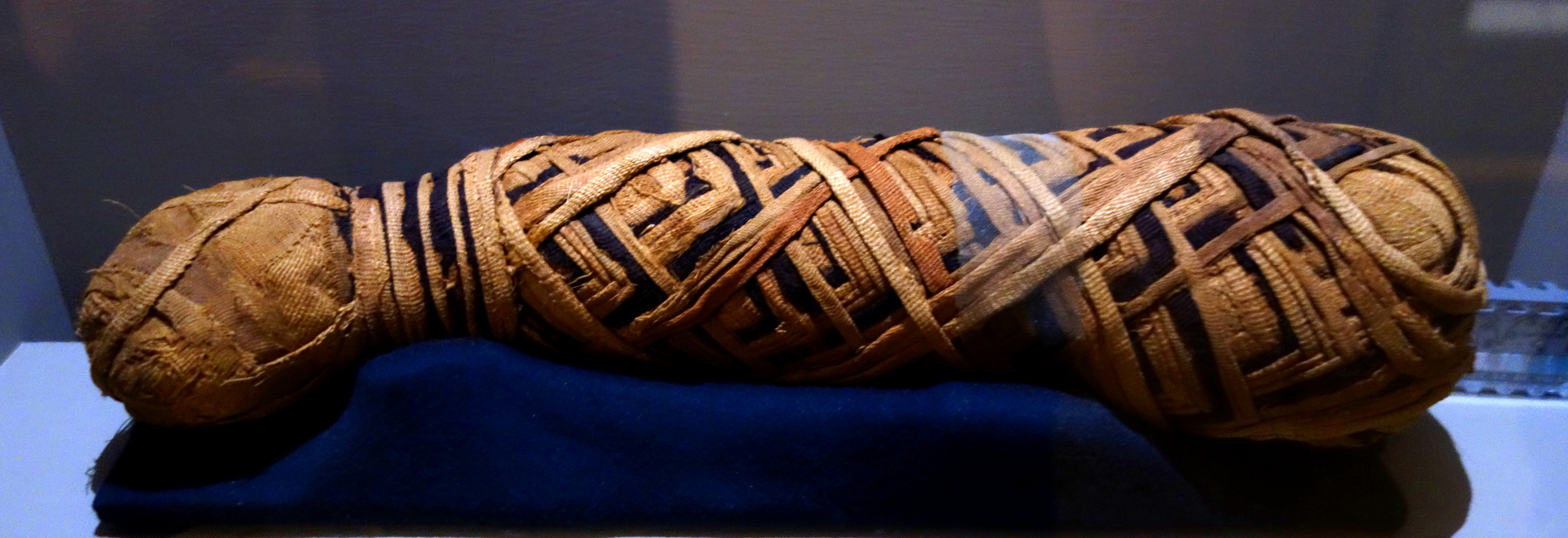
Cat mummy from Beni Hasan in the Fitchburg Art Museum

In the late 1880s, more than 200,000 mummified animals, most of them cats, were found in the cemetery of Beni Hasan in central Egypt. In 1890, William Martin Conway wrote about excavations in Speos Artemidos near Beni Hasan: "The plundering of the cemetery was a sight to see, but one had to stand well windward. The village children came from day to day and provided themselves with the most attractive mummies they could find. These they took down the river bank to sell for the smallest coin to passing travelers. The path became strewn with mummy cloth and bits of cats' skulls and bones and fur in horrid positions, and the wind blew the fragments about and carried the stink afar." In 1890, a shipment of thousands of animal mummies reached Liverpool. Most of them were cat mummies. A large part was sold as fertiliser, a small part was purchased by the zoological museum of the city's university college.

The Museum of Fine Arts of Lyon received hundreds of cat mummies excavated by Gaston Maspero at Beni Hasan, Sakkara and Thebes. The cats were of all ages from adult to kittens with deciduous teeth. Some of them were contained in statues and sarcophagi. The larger ones were bandaged in cloth of different colours with decorated heads and ears formed of rubberized tissue.

The Institut Français d'Archéologie Orientale funded excavations near Faiyum where Pierre Jouguet found a tomb full of cat mummies in 1901. It was located in the midst of tombs with crocodile mummies.

In 1907, the British Museum received a collection of 192 mummified cats and 11 small carnivores excavated at Gizeh by Flinders Petrie. The mummies probably date to between 600 and 200 BC. Two of these cat mummies were radiographed in 1980. The analysis revealed that they were deliberately strangulated before they reached the age of two years. They were probably used to supply the demand for mummified cats as votive offerings.

Remains of 23 cats were found in the early 1980s in a small mastaba tomb at the archaeological site Balat in Dakhla Oasis. The tomb was established during the Old Kingdom of Egypt in the 25th century BC and reused later. The cats were probably mummified as tissue shreds were still stuck in their bones.

Excavations in the Bubasteum area at Saqqara in the early 1980s yielded 200 cat mummies in the tomb of the Vizier Aperel. Another 184 cat mummies were found in a different part of this tomb in the 1990s, comprising 11 packets with a few cat bones and 84 packets containing mud, clay and pebbles. Radiographic examination showed that mostly young cats were mummified; most cats died of skull fractures and had dislocated spinal bones, indicating that they were beaten to death. In this site, the tomb of Tutankhamun's wet nurse Maia was discovered in 1996, which contained cat mummies next to human mummies. In 2001, the skeleton of a male lion was found in this tomb that also showed signs of mummification. It was about nine years old, probably lived in captivity for many years and showed signs of malnutrition. It had probably lived and died in the Ptolemaic period. Mummified remains of 335 domestic and 29 jungle cats were excavated in the catacombs of Anubis at Saqqara during works started in 2009.

== Legends ==
In the 2nd century, Polyaenus accounted of a stratagem allegedly deployed by the Persian king Cambyses II during the Battle of Pelusium (525 BC): Cambyses II ordered placing of cats and other animals venerated by Egyptians before the Persian front lines. Egyptians purportedly stopped their defending operations, and the Persians then conquered Pelusium.

== Gallery ==
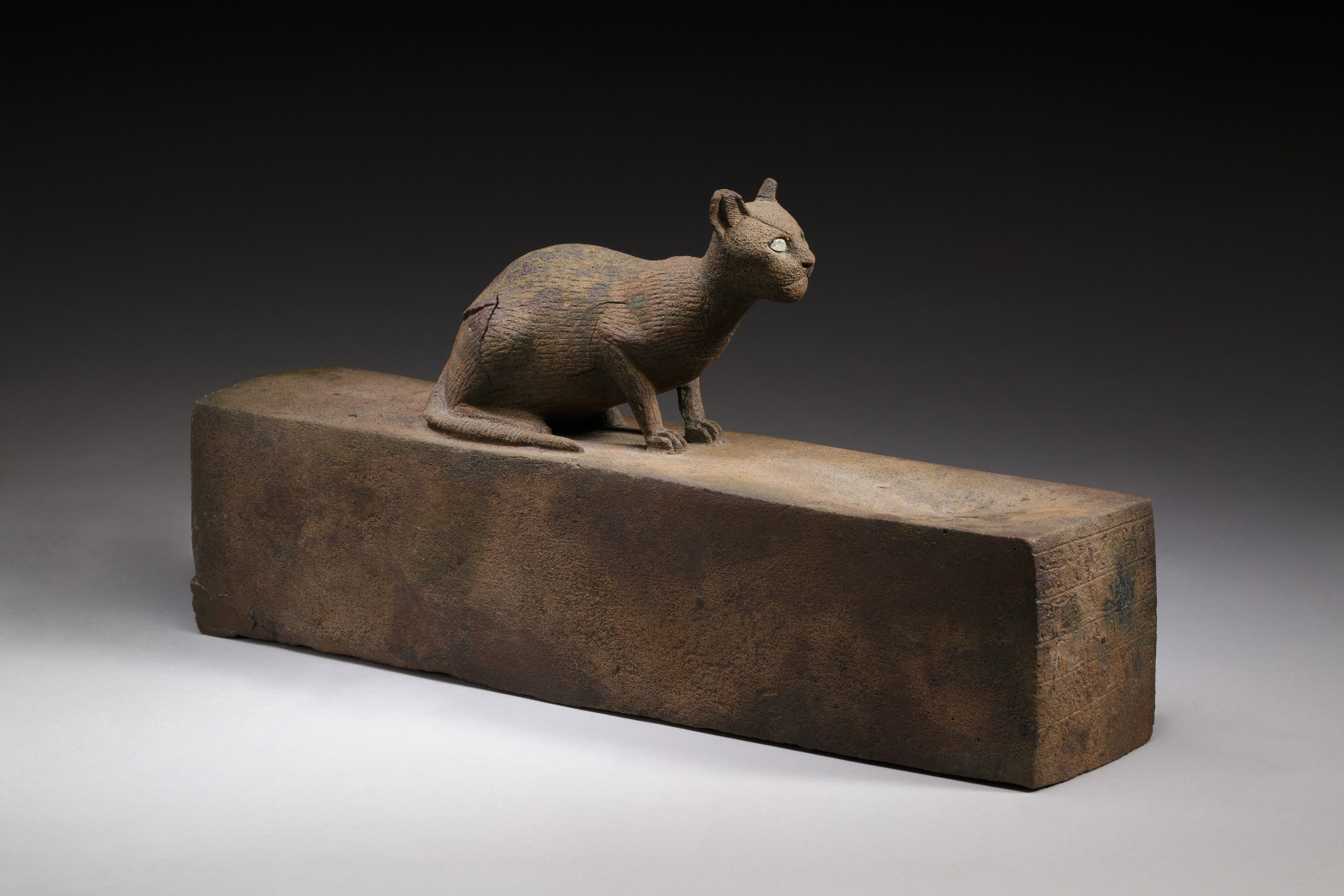
Case for animal mummy surmounted by a cat; Metropolitan Museum of Art

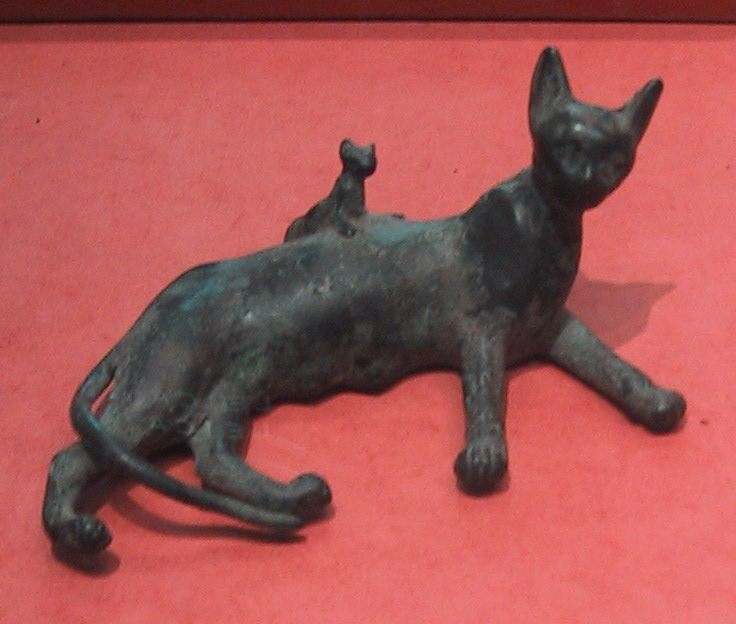
A bronze statue dated to 664−332 BC, exhibited in the Department of Egyptian Antiquities of the Louvre

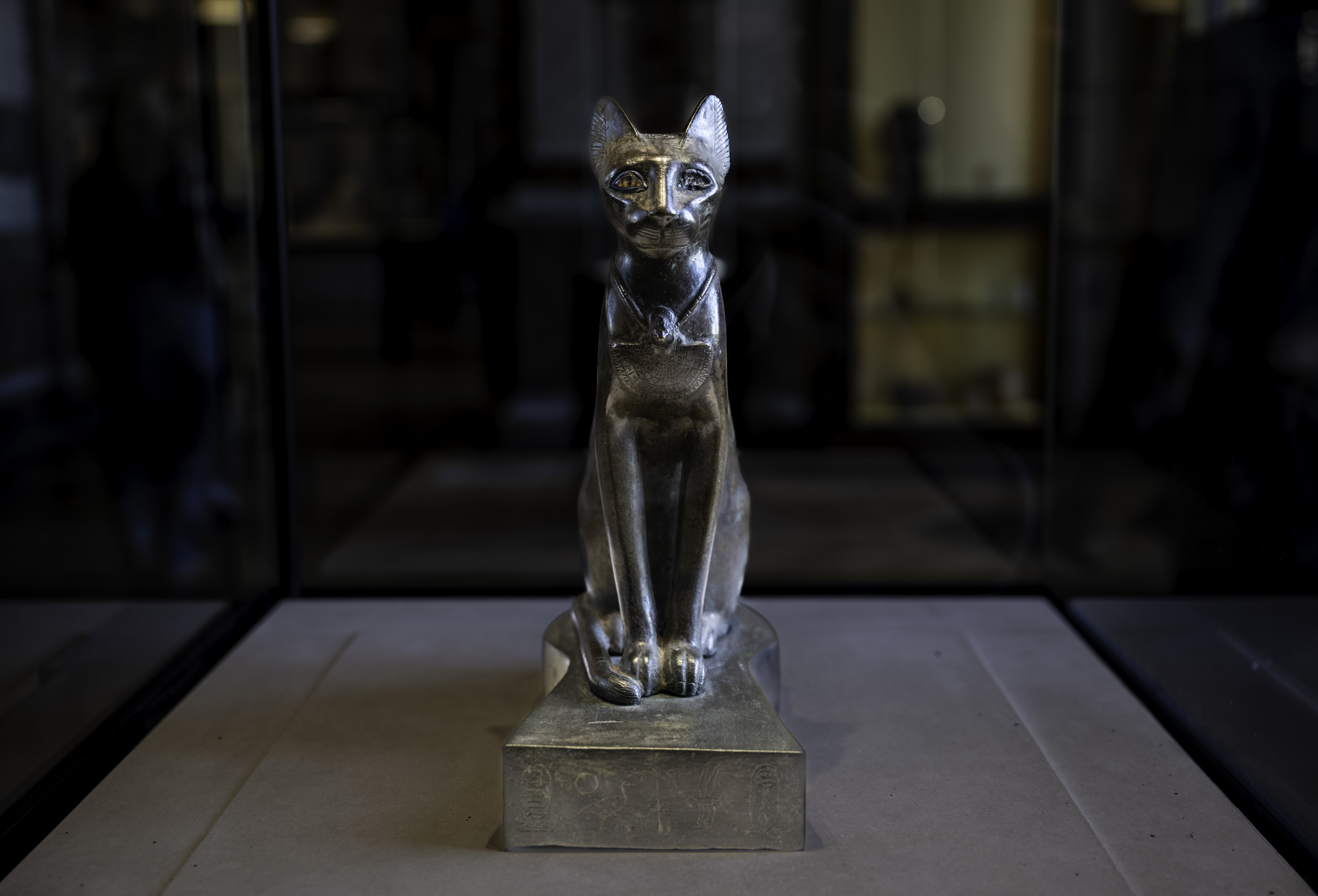
Cat statue of Bastet in the Louvre

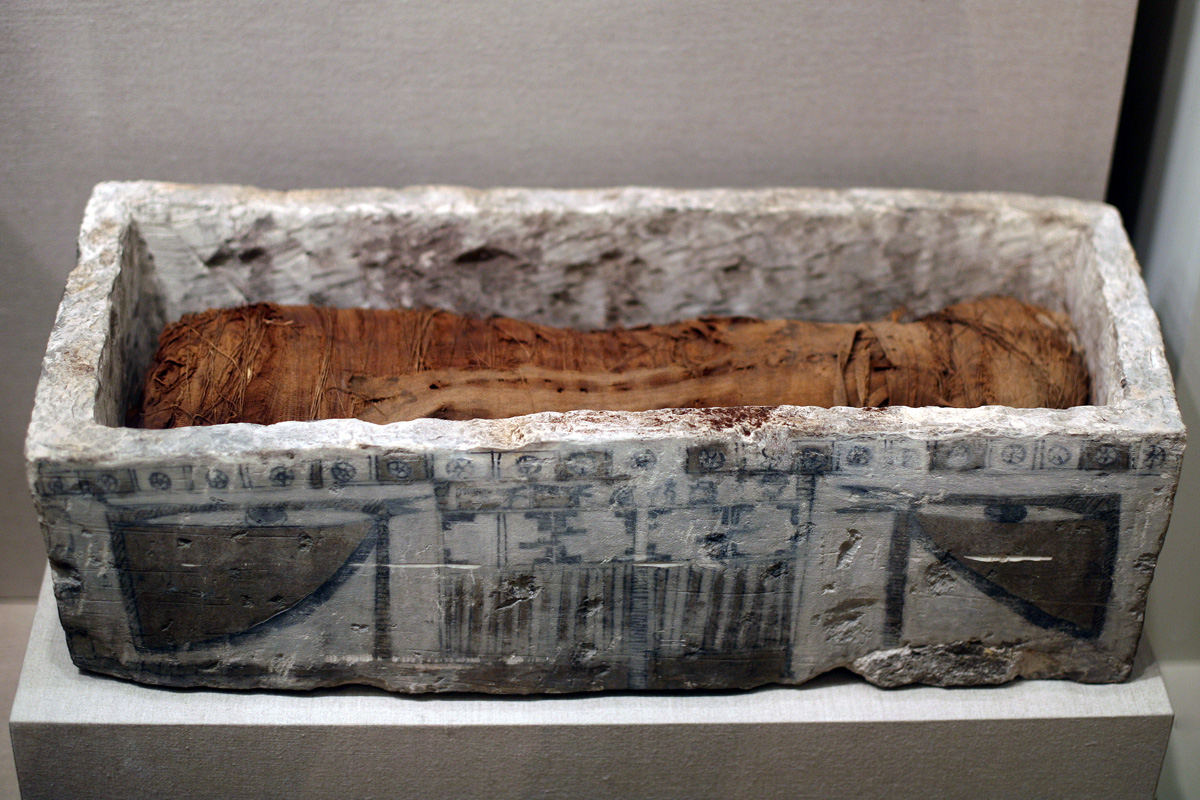
Sarcophagus for cat mummy, ca 305 BC; Brooklyn Museum

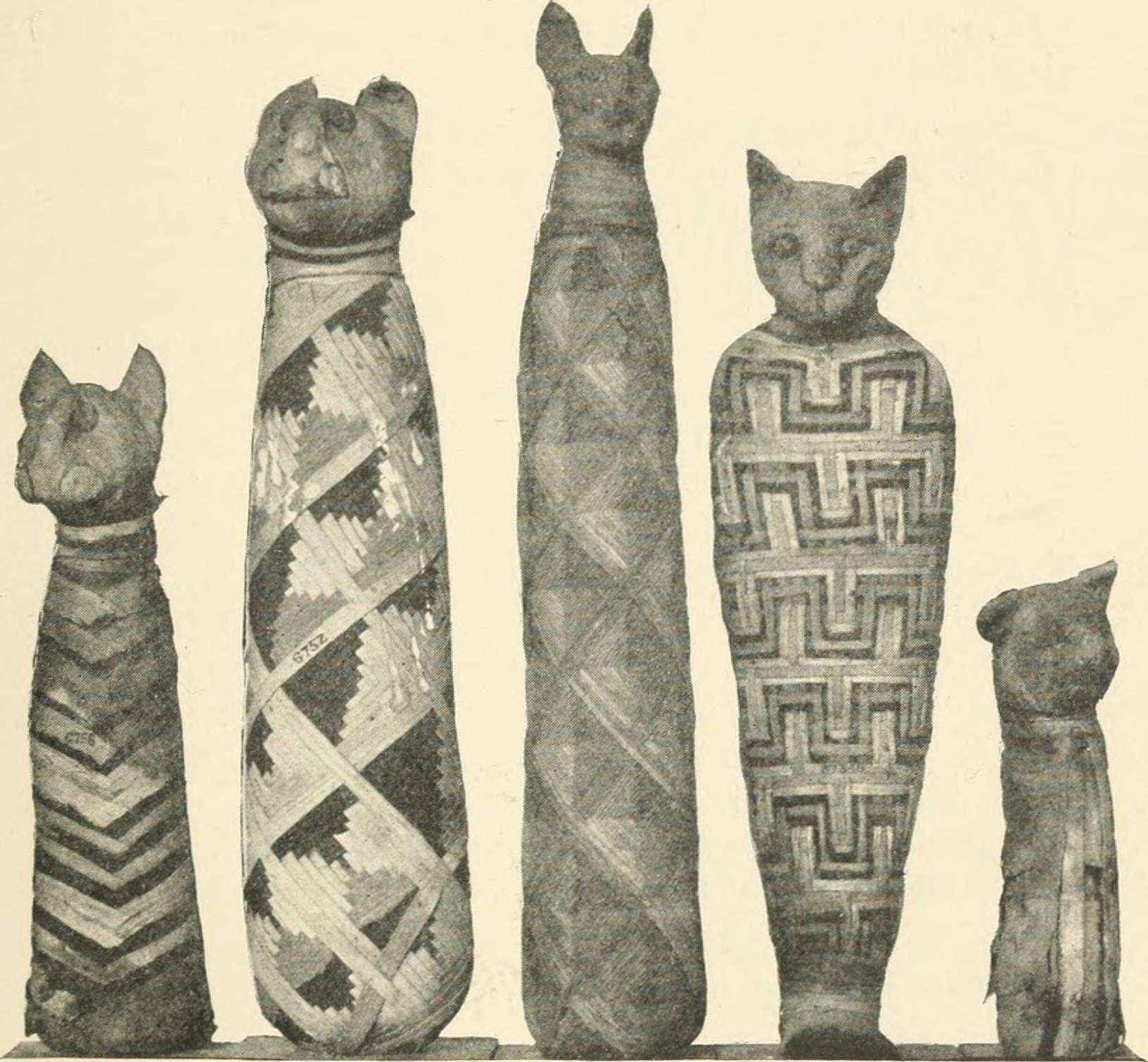
Mummified cats in the Natural History Museum, London

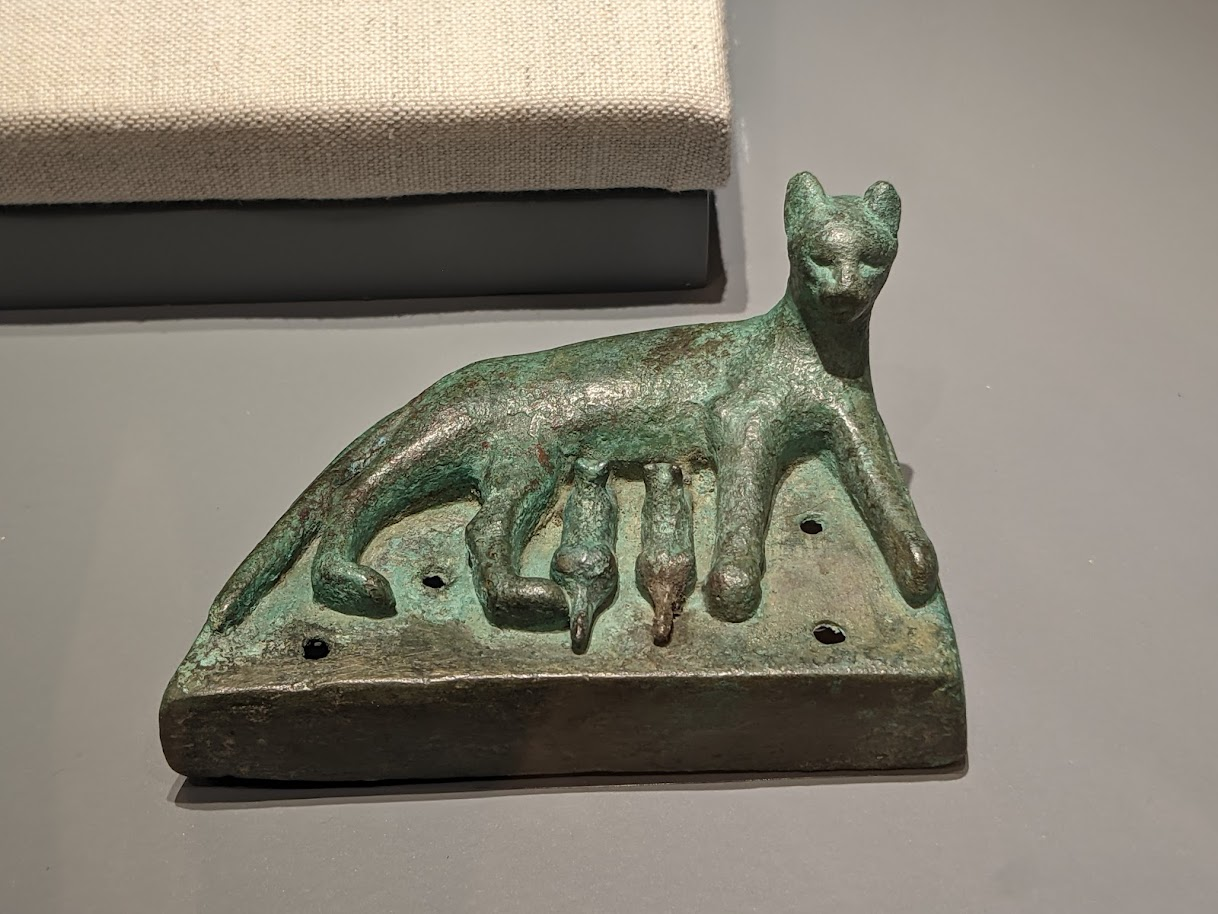
Late Egyptian bronze statuette of a mother cat nursing her kittens, dating c. 664 – c. 332 BC, Eskenazi Museum of Art

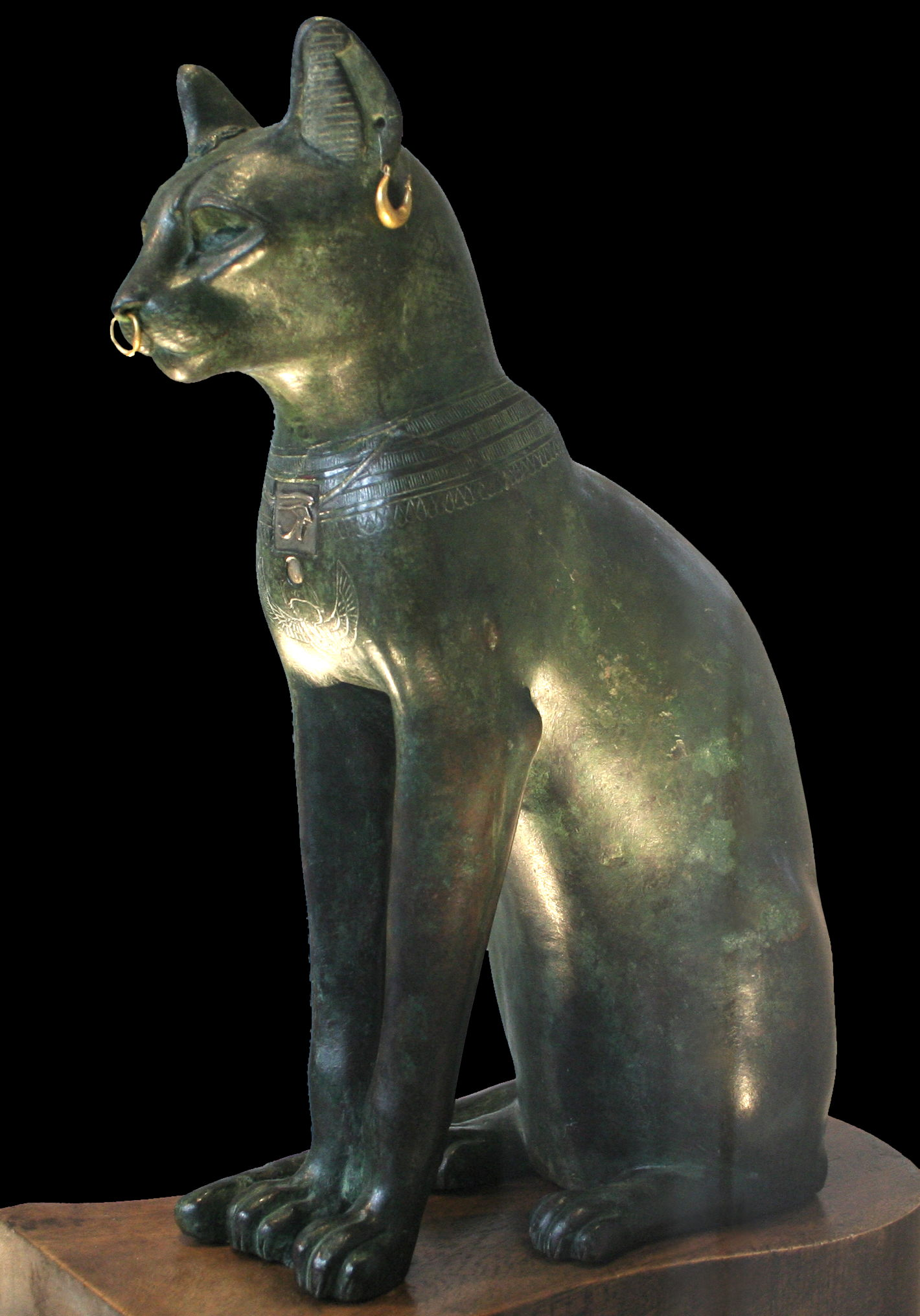
The Gayer-Anderson cat; British Museum

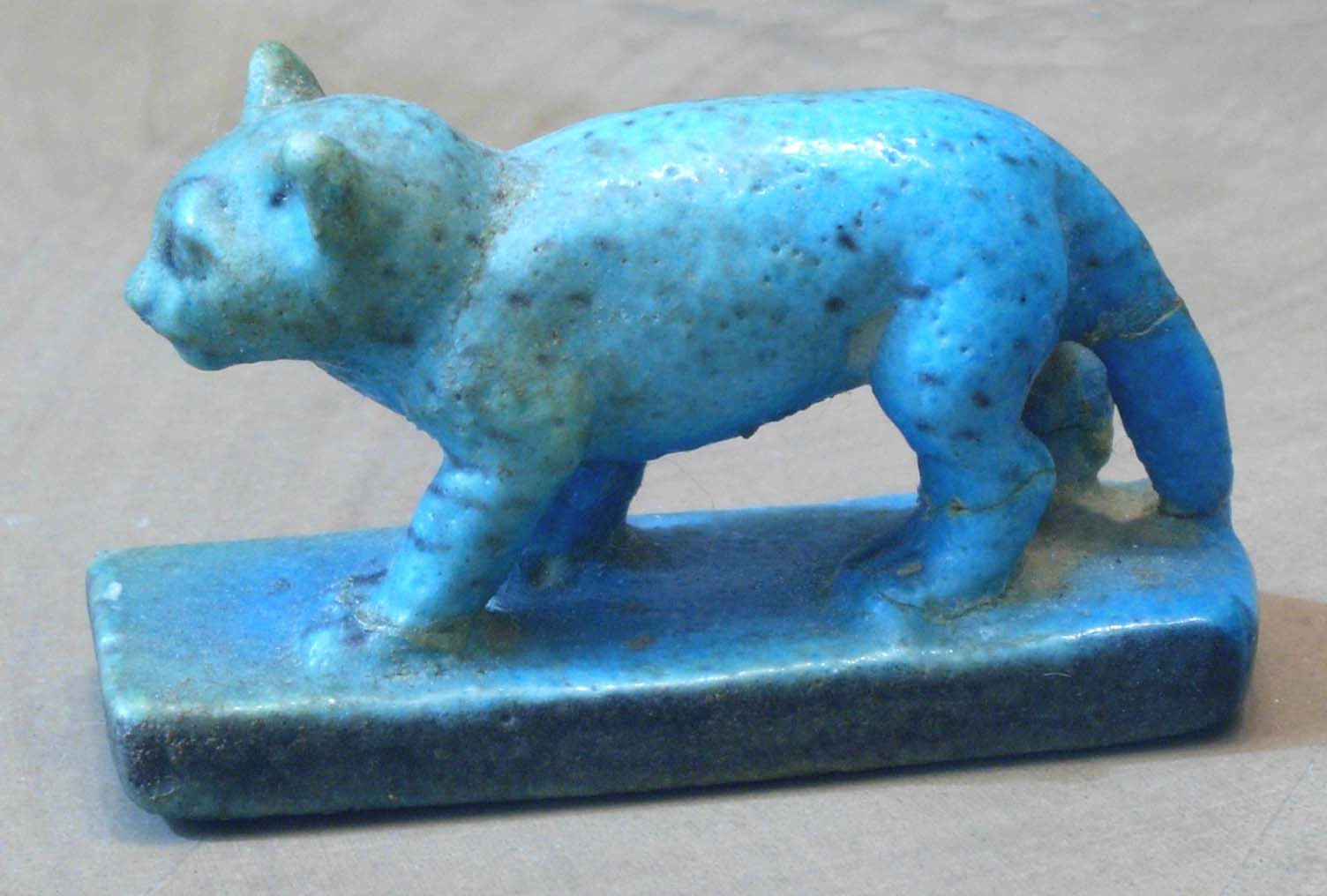
Blue Egyptian faience cat figurine dated to 1981−1802 BC

== See also ==
- Islam and cats
- Cultural depictions of cats
- Animal worship
