= Sabu (Egyptian official) =

Prominent dignitary of the Old Kingdom of ancient Egypt,

Sabu was a prominent dignitary of the Old Kingdom of ancient Egypt, dating approximately to the 5th Dynasty, around 2500 BC. He held the title "Confidant of the King."

Sabu is primarily known from his mastaba tomb at Saqqara (C 16). The mastaba, which measures approximately 36 meters in length, contains no interior chambers. Instead, there is a niche decorated with reliefs on the southern part of the eastern side. The tomb was already known by the mid-19th century. Around 1862, the traveler and photographer Aymard Athanase de Banville took two photographs there, which rank among the earliest photographic documentations of ancient Egyptian monuments.

Auguste Mariette later published sketches of the decorations as well as a ground plan of the tomb. The tomb was rediscovered in 2026.
