= Tomb of Thutmose =

The Tomb of Thutmose is a small, decorated rock-cut tomb in Saqqara in Egypt that dates to the time shortly after the Amarna Period (about 1350–1330 BC). The owner of the tomb, Thutmose, was a sculptor during his life in Egypt and it is theorized that he was the individual to create famous Nefertiti bust. Because of this, the tomb is of particular interest as investigations progress further to determine if Thutmose was indeed the sculptor responsible for the bust.

== Description ==
The burial place was found on 24 November 1996 by the Mission Archeologique Francaise de Bubaseion, under the direction of Alain Zivie. It received the number I.19 and lies directly next to the much larger tomb of Maia, nurse of Tutankhamun. The entrance to the tomb chapel is cut into the rocks at Saqqara and faces south. The whole tomb chapel consists of an entrance corridor, the main chamber, and a large niche on the western side where there opens a shaft to the underground burial chambers. The whole tomb is approximately 4.20 meter long. The main chamber is approximately 2.60 by 2 m big. A pillar stands in the middle of the main chamber. The burial chambers had been looted previously.

All walls of the tomb chapel were decorated with paintings or sunken relief. The facade of the tomb chapel is undecorated. The short corridor to the main chamber is decorated on both sides with reliefs, showing Osiris on the western side. On the opposite side only the figure of a woman is preserved. Next to the figure of Osiris on the western wall, two figures are painted. These are the draughtsman at the place of Truth Kenana and his son Pay who had the same title. The southern wall of the main chamber is occupied by the door. On the western side of it is shown Amenemwia, or Raemwia, who was the father of Thutmose. On the western wall are shown Thutmose and his wife standing in front of a priest. The northern wall has a relief showing Osiris and two people in front of him. Perhaps they represent Thutmose and his father, but captions are not preserved. The whole eastern wall is dedicated to Kenana and his family. Kenana and his wife are sitting on the left side. In front of them is depicted their whole family. Sixteen people are shown in two registers, divided by gender with men in the top and women below. The niche on the western side also is decorated. On the southern wall are shown the coffins of Thutmose and his wife Ineni, remarkably depicted from the front. On the western wall are shown the son of Thutmose, Itju and his wife and on the northern wall appear Kenena and his wife.
