= Aperel =

Vizier of ancient Egypt

- Vizier of the North
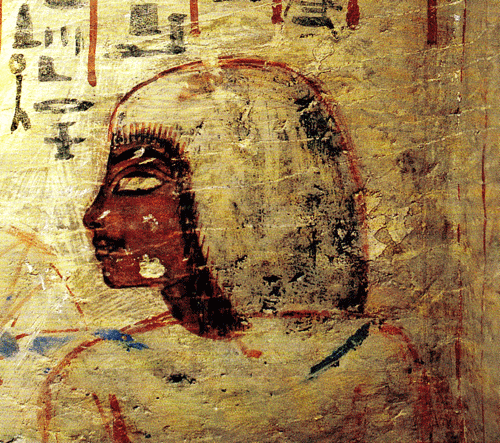
- The Vizier Aperel
Egyptian name
apr r mDAt i A
- Dynasty: 18th Dynasty
- Pharaoh: Amenhotep III and Akhenaten
- Burial: tomb I.1 Bubasteion, Saqqara
- Spouse: Taweret
- Children: Huy, Seny, Hatiay

Aperel (sometimes written as Aperia) was a vizier of ancient Egypt, who served during the reigns of the 18th-dynasty kings Amenhotep III and Akhenaten. Besides being vizier, Aperel was also a commander of chariots.

== Pronunciation and etymology ==
Aperel was pronounced "something like 'Abdiel ('Abdi-El) meaning "the servant of the god El" according to Alain Zivie.

== Family ==
During the reign of Amenhotep III, Aperel married his wife Taweret. They had at least three sons: Seny, Hatiay, and Huy. Seny was a steward and Hatiay was a priest of Nefertem.

Huy was apparently the oldest son and heir of Aperel. He holds most of the titles compared with his brothers, and also that of Commander of Chariots also held by his father. He was a commander of horses, commander of chariots, and scribe of recruits of the Lord of the Two Lands; he was also buried in the tomb of his parents.

== Tomb and burial ==
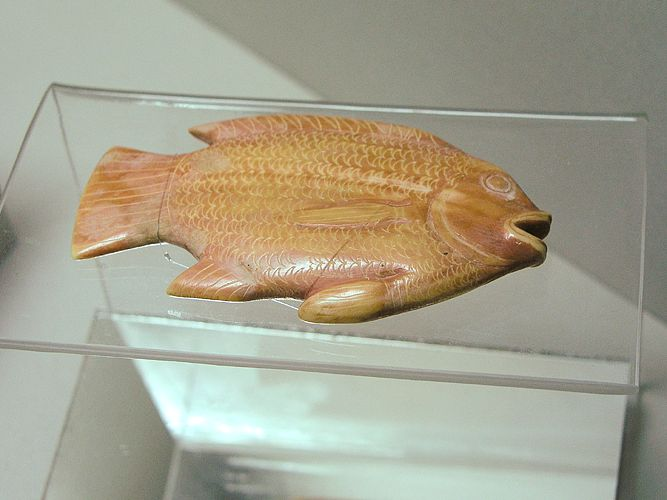
An ivory spoon in the form of a fish from Aperel's Saqqara tomb.

At Saqqara, the Tomb of Aperel was discovered in 1987 by the French under the supervision of Alain Zivie. The tomb is designated as I.1 and is located in the cliffs of the Bubasteion (a sanctuary dedicated to Bastet). Taweret, Aperia's wife, may have been an important lady in her own right, as she is the only New Kingdom woman identified to date to have been buried in a set of three coffins. Their son Huy was buried in the tenth year of Akhenaten's rule or even later. Also mentioned in the tomb are Aperel’s sons Seny, an official, and Hatiay, a priest.

According to Strouhal, Aperel was 50–60 years old at the time of his death; his wife Taweret was 40–50 years old at the time of her death, and their son Huy was 25–35 years old at the time of his death.
