= Ptahemwia =

Ancient Egyptian official who lived under king Ramses II

Ptahemwia or Ptah-em-Wia (Ptah in the barque) was an Ancient Egyptian official who lived under king Ramses II in the 19th Dynasty, around 1250 BC.

Ptahemwia had several titles, providing evidence for his positions mainly at the Ramesseum, the mortuary temple of Ramses II. These include king's scribe, Great overseer of the cattle in the Temple of Usermaatre-Setepenre in the House of Amun and overseer of the treasury of the Temple of Million of Years of the King of Upper and Lower Egypt Usermaatre-Setepenre in the House of Amun in Memphis.

Ptahemwia is known from a number of objects. In 1859, Théodule Devéria photographed the decorated doorway, later lost, of his tomb chapel at Saqqara; the names and titles of Ptahemwia are mostly still readable.

Ptahemwia is also known from some other objects. There is a pyramidion found in 1860 at Saqqara showing Ptahemwia in front of different gods, inscribed with his names and titles. A statue without head was found at Abydos in 1902, showing Ptahemwia with a smaller statue of Osiris in front of him. It is now in the National Museum of Scotland in Edinburgh. The titles listed on the statue (according to Kitchen) include overseer of Cattle, overseer of Cattle in the Temple of Usermaatre-Setepenre in the Estate of Amun, and king's scribe of Sacred Offerings of all the gods.

Ptahemwia's tomb was rediscovered at Saqqara in 2021. A 'cemetery-temple', it was mostly looted in the 19th century. It comprised an entrance, several courtyards and a temple at the western end that would have held deities, crowned with a pyramid. Paintings in colour of people with offerings and a calf slaughter were found in the first room, while the second, containing pillars, appeared to have a burial well. In 2022, Ptahemwia's sarcophagus was found at the tomb site in a burial chamber at the bottom of a vertical shaft.
