= Bubasteum =

Ptolemaic and Roman temple complex in Saqqara, Egypt

Coordinates: 29.873775°N 31.223656°E

Bubasteum in hieroglyphs
D46 O4 N35 X1 D1 N37 S34 N35 Aa1 N16 N16 N25
Dehenet-ankh-tawy
Dhnt-ˁnḫ-t3.w(j)
Cliff of Ankhtawy (Note: Ankhtawy was the name of the necropolis of Memphis.)
- Greek: Βουβαστειών

The Bubasteum or Bubasteion was a Ptolemaic and Roman temple complex dedicated to Bastet in the cliff face of the desert boundary of Saqqara. In Arabic the place is called Abwab el-Qotat ("The Gates of the Cats").

The temple complex is surrounded by a 275 m (902 ft) wide and 325 m (1,066 ft) long enclosure wall and is located southeast of the Pyramid of Teti and south of the Anubieum. It had a large entrance way in the south wall, a feline necropolis and settlements. In the New Kingdom, the location was already the site of a temple of Bastet, who was honoured as the Lady of Ankhtawy.

Proper investigation of the site was begun in 1976 by Alain-Pierre Zivie and the first excavations began in 1980. In 1986, the Mission Archéologique Française du Bubasteion (MAFB), was founded, which has overseen all investigations of the site since then.

== Feline necropolis ==
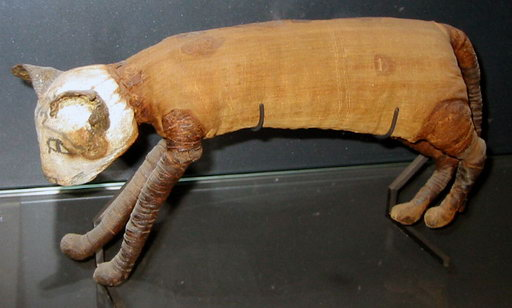
Mummified cat

In the second half of the 18th Dynasty, high dignitaries created rock-cut tombs for themselves in this area, which were later reused as cat-catacombs. To date, more than a hundred cat mummies and thousands of cat bones have been found. The cat cemetery developed in the second half of the first millennium BC became as important as the cat cemetery at Bubastis. Radiographic investigations showed that the majority of cats were killed at a young age by either strangulation or by violent blows on their skulls. Several examined packets contained only a few cat bones, and others even no bones at all, but only clay and pebbles. The cats were mummified in two different manners. In the one, the legs and tail were bound and wrapped close to the body; in the other, head, body, legs and tail were separately wrapped in cloth, some with eyes and ears added. Some mummies were found in wooden or stone sarcophagi. Some were even buried with kittens, sculptures, jewellery and amulets. The mummification procedure was quite basic: the animal was simply dried out without removing the innards. The priests perhaps sold pilgrims mummies of different qualities.

In the tomb of Tutankhamun's wet-nurse Maia found on the site in 1996, a lion skeleton was excavated in 2001. The lion was considered a manifestation of the god Maahes, son of Bastet.

In 2019, five lion mummies were found at the necropolis.

== Tombs ==
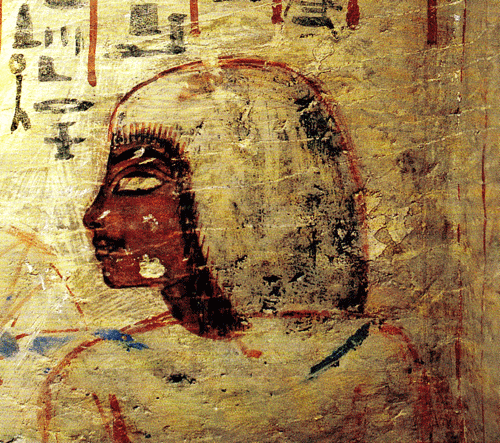
Wall painting from the tomb of Aperel

On the south side of the Bubasteum, near the excavation headquarters of the French mission, is a Steilhang, which contains two levels of tombs. These were created by high officials in the 18th and 19th Dynasties and were plundered in the Late Period. After this they were remodelled and reused for the cat mummies from the nearby sanctuary of Bastet. Two of these tombs were discovered in the early 1980s and the rest have been uncovered more recently. The majority of the graves are carved from the rock face, but some are built of high-value Tura limestone. The decoration is very diverse, often differing significantly within individual tombs. It consists mainly of reliefs, as well as paintings which vary from good to exceptional quality. Many of the items discovered in the tombs, especially those from the tomb of Aperel, are now found in the Imhotep Museum at Saqqara.

=== List of the tombs in the Bubasteum ===
The numbering of the tombs is that of the MAFB, in which the tombs of the upper level are numbered with a Roman numeral I and those of the lower level with a II. There is possibly a third level, buried under debris. After the Roman numeral, the individual tombs are numbered from east to west with Arabic numerals

Tomb No.	Tomb owner	Date
Bub. I.1	Aperel	Reign of Amenhotep III and Akhenaten
Bub. I.3	Resh (official)	Reign of Thutmosis IV and Amenhotep III.
Bub. I.5	Merisakhmet	End of the 18th Dynasty
Bub. I.6	Nehsi	Reign of Hatshepsut
Bub. I.13	Seth (Cupbearer)	Reign of Amenhotep III
Bub. I.16	Netjerwymes (Parichnawa)	Reign of Ramses II
Bub. I.19	Thutmose (sculptor), Kenna	
Bub. I.20	Maia (nurse)	Reign of Tutankhamun and Ay
Bub. I.21	Penrenut	Reign of Merneptah
Bub. I.27	Raia (treasury clerk) (Note: Also known as Hatiay.)	Reign of Akhenaten
Bub. II.4	Meryre (treasurer)	Reign of Amenhotep III.
Bub. II.x	Ptahmose	Reign of Amenhotep III.

== See also ==
- Mervat Seif el-Din

== Bibliography ==
- Dieter Arnold: Lexikon der ägyptischen Baukunst. Albatros, Düsseldorf 2000, ISBN 3491960010, pp. 43–44, → Bubasteion (Saqqara).
- Alain-Pierre Zivie: The Lost Tombs of Saqqara. cara.cara edition, Toulouse 2007, ISBN 2-913805-02-7.
