= Bastet =

Ancient Egyptian goddess

- Bastet in her late form of a cat-headed woman (rather than a lioness) holding an ankh and sistrum
Name in hieroglyphs
W2 t t
- Major cult center: Bubastis
- Symbol: lioness, cat, ointment jar, sistrum, solar disk

Genealogy
- Parents: Ra and Isis
- Siblings: Shu, Tefnut, Hathor, Sekhmet, Mafdet, Satet, Ma'at, Mut, Anat, Qetesh, Anhur (paternal half-siblings); Min, Horus the Younger, Four Sons of Horus the Elder (maternal half-siblings)
- Consort: Ptah (in some myths), Anubis (disputed)
- Offspring: Maahes

Equivalents
- Greek: Artemis

Bastet in her earlier form of a lioness-headed woman depicted the same or very similar to Sekhmet

Bastet or Bast (Ancient Egyptian: bꜣstt), also known as Ubasti (Note: Coptic: Ⲟⲩⲃⲁⲥϯ, romanized: Oubasti, Coptic pronunciation: [ʔuˈβastə];) or Bubastis, (Note: Ancient Greek: Βούβαστις, romanized: Bûbastis, where -ούβαστις (-ûbastis) is probably the name of the goddess herself, and the Β- is an intrusive conflation with her centre of worship, Ancient Egyptian: pr-bꜣstt.) is a goddess of ancient Egyptian religion worshipped as early as the Second Dynasty (2890 BCE). In ancient Greek religion, she was known as Ailuros (Koine Greek: αἴλουρος, lit. 'cat').

Bastet was worshipped in Bubastis in Lower Egypt, originally as a lioness goddess, a role shared by other deities such as Sekhmet. Eventually Bastet and Sekhmet were characterized as two aspects of the same goddess, with Sekhmet representing the powerful warrior and protector aspect, and Bastet, who increasingly was depicted as a cat, representing a gentler aspect.

== Name ==
Bastet, which is the form of the name that is most commonly adopted by Egyptologists today because of its use in later dynasties, is a modern convention offering one possible reconstruction. In early Egyptian hieroglyphs, her name appears to have been bꜣstt. James Peter Allen vocalizes the original form of the name as buʔístit or buʔístiat, with ʔ representing a glottal stop. In Middle Egyptian writing, the second t marks a feminine ending but usually was not pronounced, and the aleph ꜣ may have moved to a position before the accented syllable, ꜣbst. By the first millennium, then, bꜣstt would have been something like *Ubaste (< *Ubastat) in Egyptian speech, later becoming Coptic Oubaste. The name is rendered in Phoenician as 𐤀𐤁𐤎𐤕, romanized: ’bst, or 𐤁𐤎𐤕, romanized: bst.

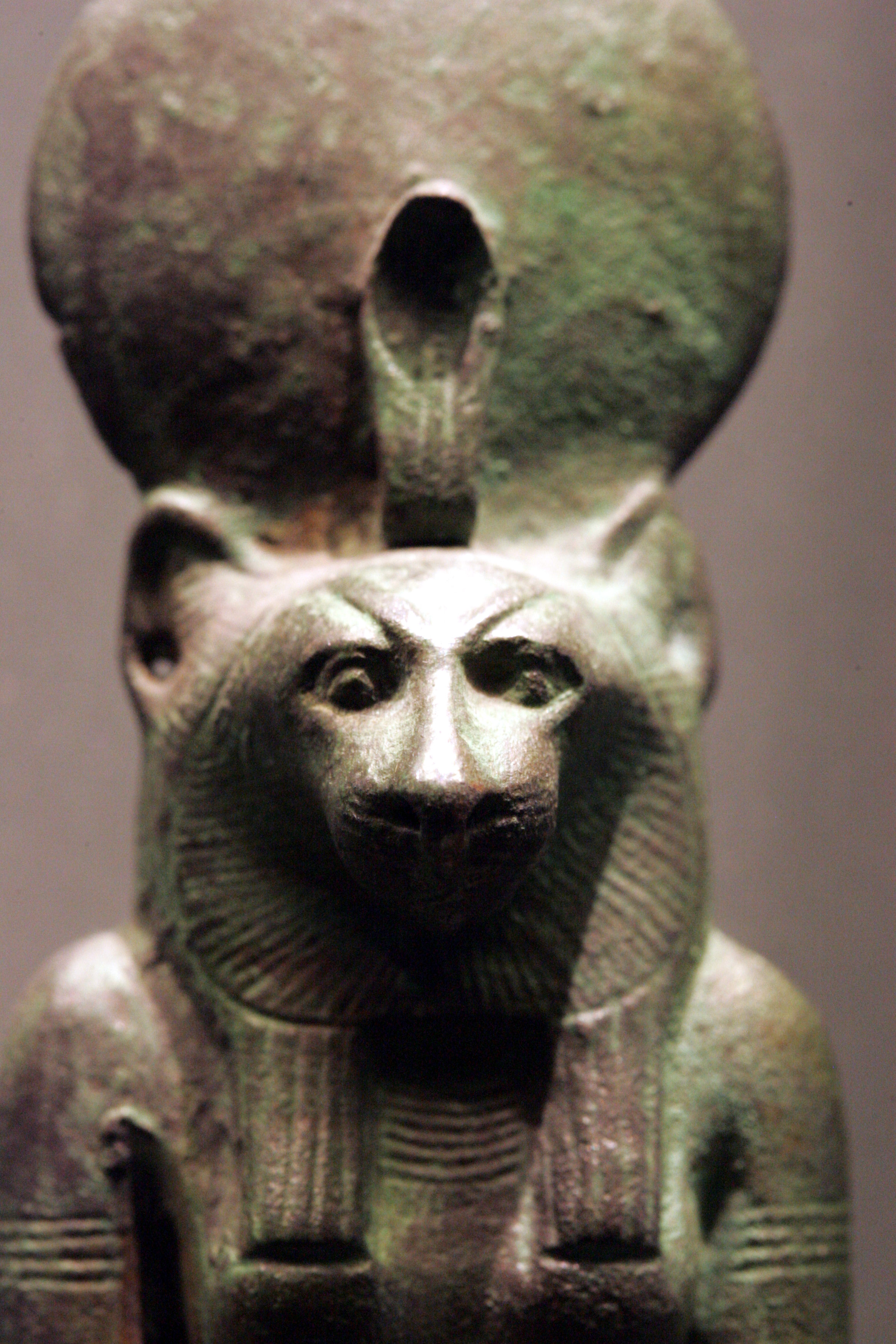
Wadjet-Bastet, with a lioness head, the solar disk, and the cobra that represents Wadjet

What the name of the goddess means remains uncertain. Names of ancient Egyptian deities often were represented as references to associations or with euphemisms, being cult secrets. One recent suggestion by Stephen Quirke (Ancient Egyptian Religion) explains Bastet as meaning, "She of the ointment jar". This ties in with the observation that her name was written with the hieroglyph for ointment jar (bꜣs) and that she was associated with protective ointments, among other things. The name of the material known as alabaster might, through Greek, come from the name of the goddess. This association would have come about much later than when the goddess was a protective lioness goddess, however, and is useful only in deciphering the origin of the term, alabaster.

James P. Allen instead derives the name as a nisba construction from a place name "Baset" (bꜣst) with the meaning "she of bꜣst".

== Role in ancient Egypt ==
Bastet was originally a fierce lioness warrior goddess of the sun, worshipped throughout most of ancient Egyptian history. Later she became the cat goddess that is familiar today. She was then depicted as the daughter of Ra and Isis, and the consort of Ptah, with whom she had a son, Maahes.

As protector of Lower Egypt, she was seen as defender of the king, and consequently of the sun god, Ra. Along with other deities such as Hathor, Sekhmet, and Isis, Bastet was associated with the Eye of Ra. She has been depicted as fighting the evil snake named Apep, an enemy of Ra. In addition to her solar connections, she was also related to Wadjet, one of the oldest Egyptian goddesses from the Southern Delta who was dubbed "eye of the moon".

Bastet was also a goddess of pregnancy and childbirth, possibly because of the fertility of the domestic cat.

Images of Bastet were often created from alabaster. The goddess was sometimes depicted holding a ceremonial sistrum in one hand and an aegis in the other—the aegis usually resembling a collar or gorget, embellished with a lioness head.

Bastet was also depicted as the goddess of protection against contagious diseases and evil spirits.

== History ==
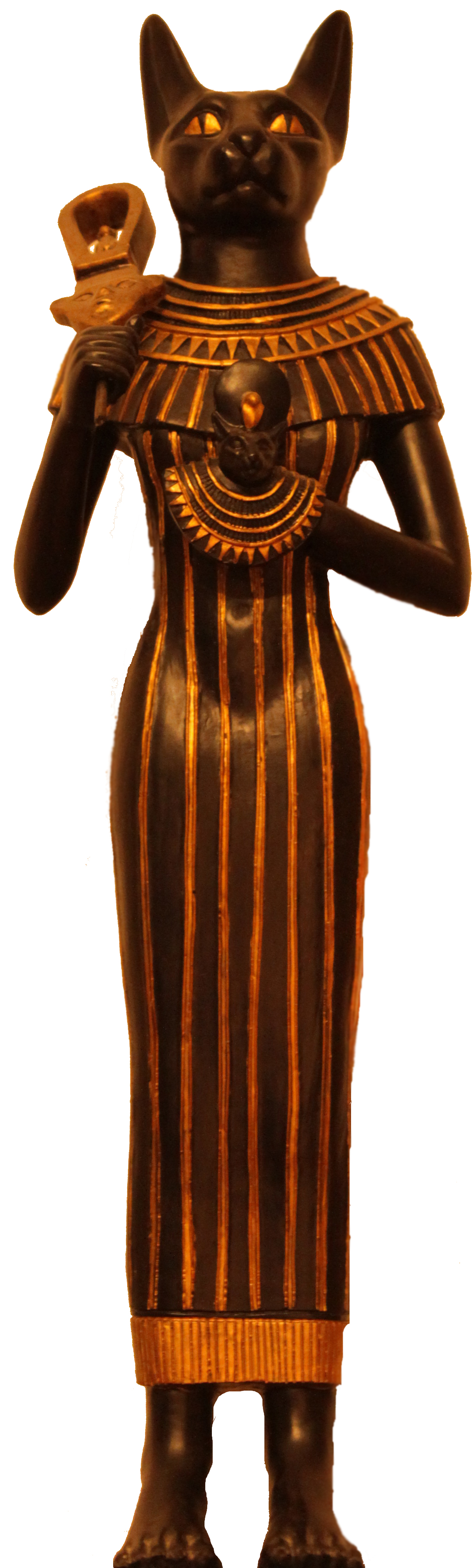
Statue of Bastet holding a sistrum

Her name was originally shorter, transliterated as Bast in English. Bast first appears in the third millennium BCE, where she is depicted as either a fierce lioness or a woman with the head of a lioness. Two thousand years later, during the Third Intermediate Period of Egypt (c. 1070–712 BCE), Bast began to be depicted as a domestic cat or a cat-headed woman. Scribes of the New Kingdom and later eras began referring to her with an additional feminine suffix, as Bastet. The name change is thought to have been added to emphasize pronunciation of the ending t sound, often left silent.

Cats in ancient Egypt were highly revered, partly due to their ability to combat vermin such as mice and rats which threatened key food supplies, as well as snakes—especially cobras. Cats of royalty were, in some instances, known to be dressed in golden jewelry and allowed to eat from the same plate as other members of the household. Dennis C. Turner and Patrick Bateson estimate that during the Twenty-second Dynasty (c. 945–715 BCE), Bastet changed from being a lioness deity into being predominantly a major cat deity.

The native Egyptian rulers were replaced by Greeks during an occupation of Ancient Egypt in the Ptolemaic Dynasty that lasted almost 300 years. The Greeks sometimes equated Bastet with one of their goddesses, Artemis.

Bastet was depicted by Egyptians with the head of a cat and the slender body of a woman. Sometimes, Bastet was venerated as just a cat head.

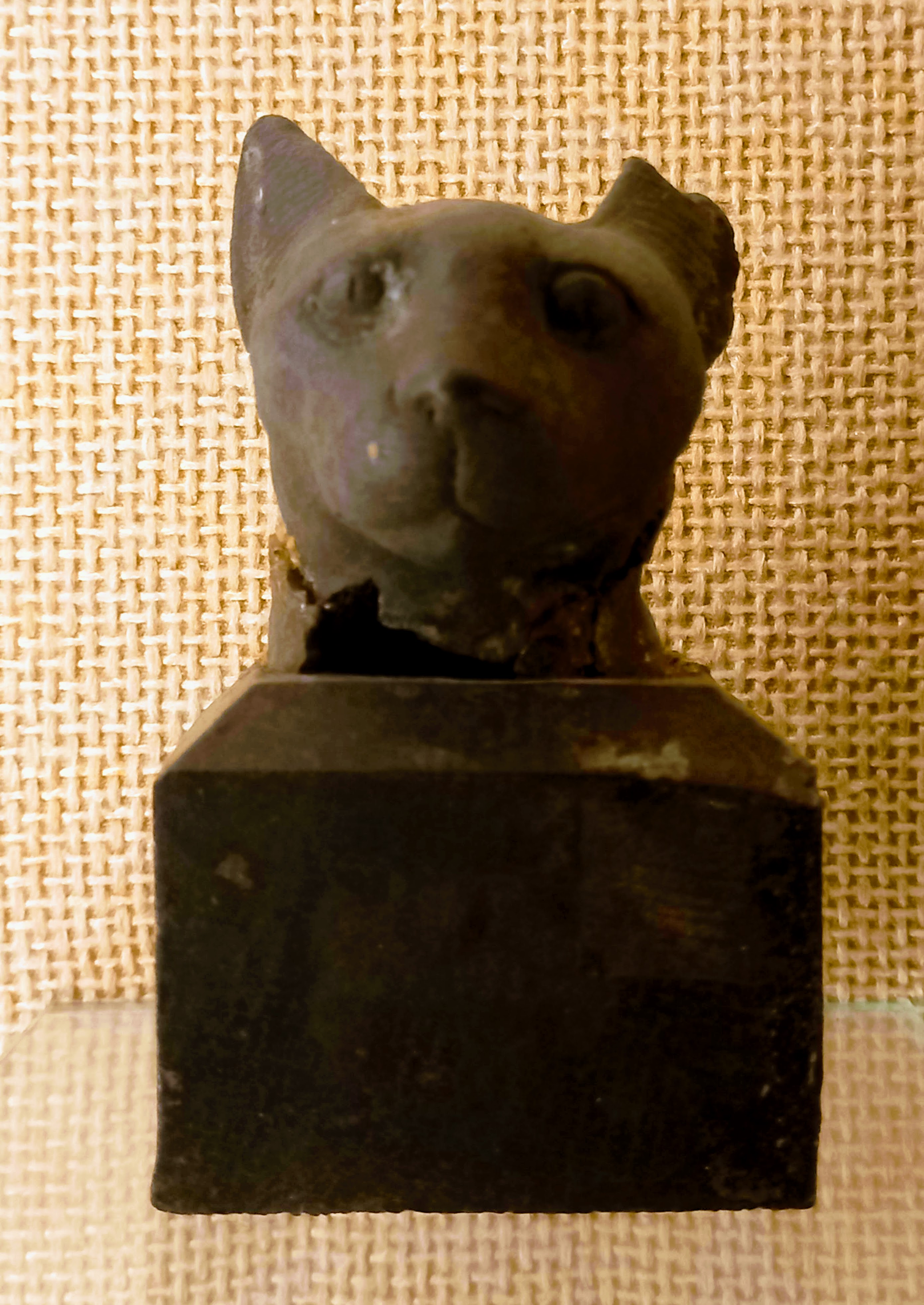
Bastet, Albert Hall Museum, Jaipur, India

Because domestic cats tend to be tender and protective of their offspring, Bastet was also regarded as a good mother and sometimes was depicted with numerous kittens.

== Bubastis ==
Bastet was a local deity whose religious sect was centered in the city in the Nile Delta later named Bubastis. It lay near what is known today as Zagazig. The town, known in Egyptian as pr-bꜣstt (transliterated as Per-Bastet), carries her name, literally meaning House of Bastet. It was known in Greek as Boubastis (Βούβαστις) and translated into Hebrew as Pî-beset, spelled without the initial t sound of the last syllable. In the biblical Book of Ezekiel 30:17, the town appears in the Hebrew form Pibeseth.

=== Temple ===
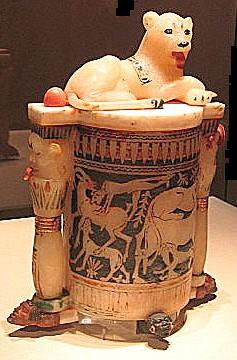
An Eighteenth Dynasty burial artifact from the tomb of Tutankhamun (c. 1323 BC), an alabaster cosmetic jar topped with a lioness representing Bastet — Cairo Museum

Herodotus, an ancient Greek historian who traveled in Egypt in the fifth century BCE, describes Bastet's temple at some length:

Save for the entrance, it stands on an island; two separate channels approach it from the Nile, and after coming up to the entry of the temple, they run round it on opposite sides; each of them a hundred feet wide, and overshadowed by trees. The temple is in the midst of the city, the whole circuit of which commands a view down into it; for the city's level has been raised, but that of the temple has been left as it was from the first, so that it can be seen into from without. A stone wall, carven with figures, runs round it; within is a grove of very tall trees growing round a great shrine, wherein is the image of the goddess; the temple is a square, each side measuring a furlong. A road, paved with stone, of about three furlongs' length leads to the entrance, running eastward through the market place, towards the temple of Hermes; this road is about 400 feet wide, and bordered by trees reaching to heaven.

This description by Herodotus and several Egyptian texts suggest that water surrounded the temple on three (out of four) sides, forming a type of lake known as isheru, not too dissimilar from that surrounding the temple of the mother goddess Mut in Karnak at Thebes. These lakes were typical components of temples devoted to a number of lioness goddesses (Bastet, Mut, Tefnut, Hathor, Sakhmet) who are said to represent one original goddess and who came to be associated with sun gods such as Horus and Ra, as well as the Eye of Ra. Each of these goddesses had to be appeased by a specific set of rituals. One myth relates that a lioness, fiery and wrathful, was cooled down by the water of the lake and thus was transformed into a gentle cat, settling down in the temple.

At the Bubastis temple, large numbers of cats were found to have been mummified and buried, many next to their owners. More than 300,000 mummified cats were discovered when Bastet's temple was excavated. Turner and Bateson suggest that the status of the cat in Egypt was roughly equivalent to that of the cow in modern India. The death of a cat might leave a family in great mourning, and those who could afford the expense would have the cat embalmed or buried in pet cemeteries, which demonstrates the great prevalence of the cult of Bastet. Extensive burials of cat remains have been found not only at Bubastis but also at Saqqara, including the temple complex known as the Bubasteum. In 1888, a farmer uncovered a burial site of many hundreds of thousands of cats in Beni Hasan.

=== Festival ===
Herodotus relates that of the many solemn festivals held in Egypt, the most important and most popular one was that celebrated in Bubastis in honor of this goddess. Each year on the day of her festival, the town was said to have attracted some 700,000 visitors, both men and women (but not children), who arrived in numerous crowded ships. The women engaged in music, song, and dance on their way to the place. Great sacrifices were made and prodigious amounts of wine were drunk—more than was the case throughout the year. This accords well with Egyptian sources which prescribe that lioness goddesses are to be appeased with the "feasts of drunkenness". A festival of Bastet was known to be celebrated during the New Kingdom at Bubastis. The block statue from the eighteenth dynasty (c. 1380 BCE) of Nefer-ka, the wab-priest of Sekhmet, provides written evidence for this. The inscription suggests that the king, Amenhotep III, was present at the event and had great offerings made to the deity.

== See also ==
- Gayer-Anderson cat
- List of solar deities
