= Maia (nurse) =

Wet nurse of the ancient Egyptian pharaoh Tutankhamun

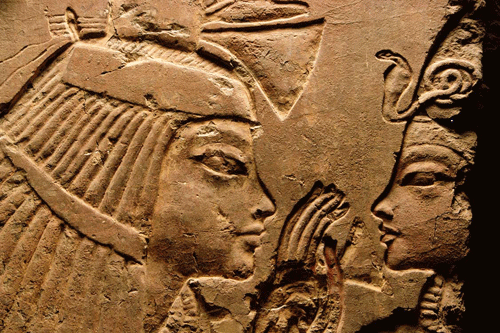
Relief showing Maia and Tutankhamun

gs a i A
Maia
in hieroglyphs
Era: New Kingdom
(1550–1069 BC)

Maia was the wet nurse of the ancient Egyptian pharaoh Tutankhamun in the 14th century BC. Her rock-cut tomb was discovered in the Saqqara necropolis in 1996.

== Biography ==
Maia bears the titles "wet nurse of the king", "educator of the god's body" and "great one of the harem". Her origin and relatives are not known. Apart from Tutankhamun, the Overseer of the Magazine Rahotep, the High Priest of Thoth, and scribes named Tetinefer and Ahmose are mentioned in inscriptions. Due to the close resemblance of Maia with Tutankhamun's sister Meritaten, it was suggested that the two are identical.

== The tomb ==
Maia's tomb was discovered in 1996 by the French archaeologist Alain Zivie and his team in the vicinity of the Bubasteion complex dedicated to the deity Bastet at Saqqara. The outside of the tomb is built on limestone with four pillars forming a square. The side walls of the entrance are decorated with colourful and well preserved inscriptions. A relief in the tomb's first chamber shows Maia sitting on a chair with Tutankhamun on her lap and surrounded by six people honouring the young king. On the opposite wall there is a badly damaged scene showing Maia in front of the king. Only three limestone blocks of these scenes are preserved. A door leads to a second longer chamber found full of rubble and partly burnt mummified cats. The second room is dedicated to the burial rites associated with Maia. Maia is shown in front of offering bearers. She is depicted as a mummy in relation to the opening of the mouth ritual and she is standing before the underworld god Osiris. Another door opens to a third chamber, a hall with pillars, also found full of rubble. The pillars are decorated with the image of Maia. The back of the room shows a stela carved into the rock with Maia in front of Osiris. From this hall, a shaft leads to a lower level of the tomb. The tomb's chapel contained a limestone sarcophagus with a cat mummy inside. Masonry work carried out in later periods covered wall paintings in the third chamber and included several pillars into the chamber's walls. Once uncovered, these pillars revealed paintings of Maia. A stela carved out of rock in the back of this room bears reliefs and inscriptions.

In 2001, the team started to explore the tomb's first lower level, which also contained large amounts of cat mummies beside human mummies, votive objects, statues and sarcophagi. This level had also been reused in later periods of the tomb's history. On this level, the skeleton of a male lion was found in autumn 2001. It did not have any bandages, but showed signs of mummification similar to other cat mummies found in the tomb. It had probably lived and died in the Ptolemaic period.

The second lower level was explored in autumn 2002. It is smaller than the previous levels and has not been reused.

In December 2015 the tomb was opened for the public.
