= Saqqara =

Burial ground in Giza Governorate, Egypt

- سقارة (Arabic)
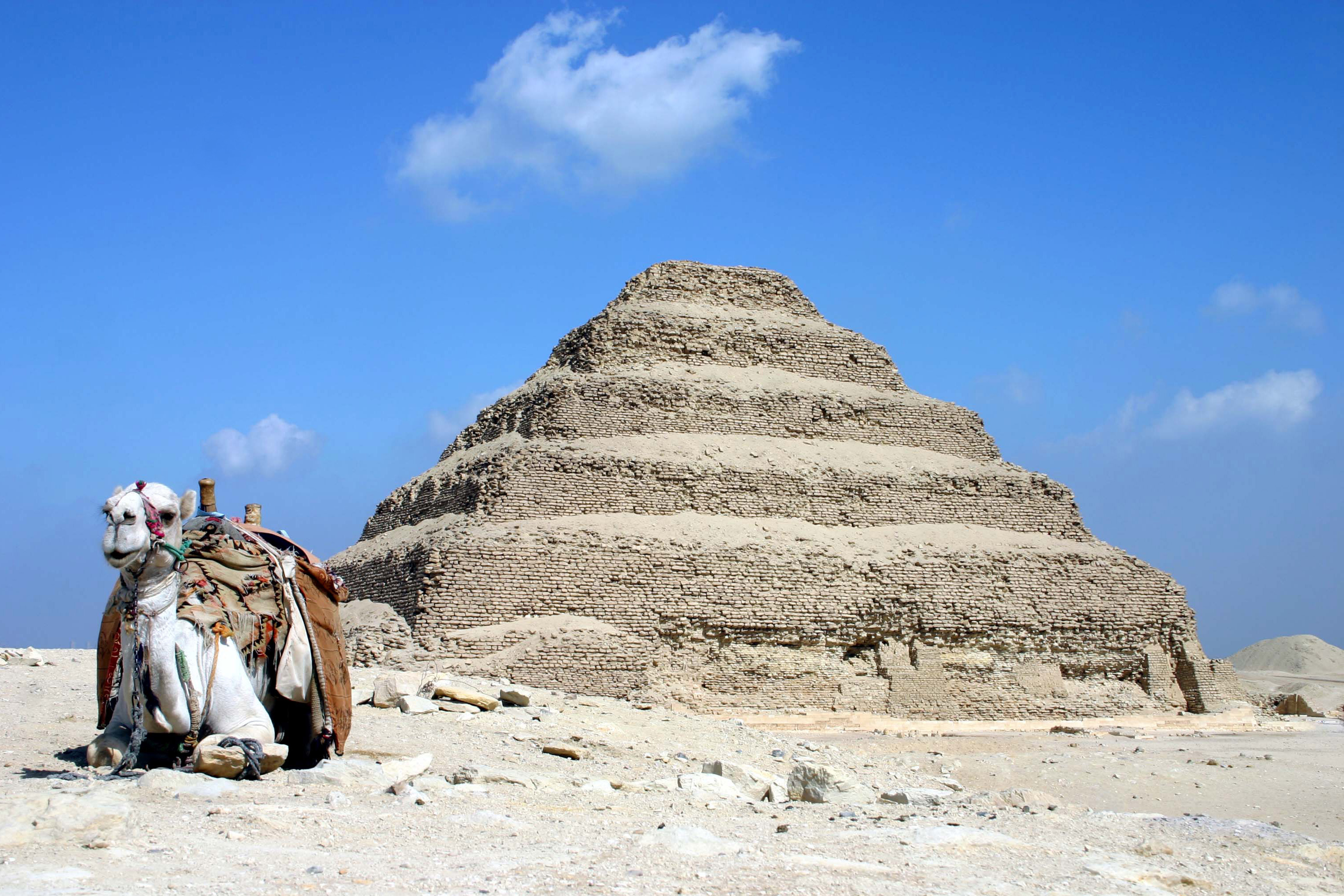
- The stepped Pyramid of Djoser at Saqqara

- Location within Egypt
- 29°52′16″N 31°12′59″E
- Type: Necropolis
- Periods: Early Dynastic Period to Middle Ages
- Location: Giza Governorate, Egypt
- Region: Lower Egypt

UNESCO World Heritage Site
- Part of: "Pyramid fields from Giza to Dahshur"; part of Memphis and its Necropolis – the Pyramid Fields from Giza to Dahshur
- Includes: Buried Pyramid; Gisr el-Mudir; Pyramid of Djoser; Mastabat al-Fir’aun; Pyramid of Userkaf; Pyramid of Djedkare Isesi; Tomb of Khnumhotep and Niankhkhnum; Pyramid of Unas; Pyramid of Teti; Tomb of Akhethetep; Mortuary complex of Pepi I; Pyramid of Merenre; Tomb of Perneb; Pyramid of Khendjer; Serapeum of Saqqara
- Criteria: Cultural: (i), (iii), (vi)
- Reference: 86-002
- Inscription: 1979 (3rd Session)
- Area: 16,203.36 ha (62.5615 sq mi)

Saqqara (Arabic: سقارة : saqqāra[t], Egyptian Arabic pronunciation: [sɑʔːɑːɾɑ]), also spelled Sakkara or Saccara in English /səˈkɑːrə/, is an Egyptian village in the markaz (county) of Badrashin in the Giza Governorate, that contains ancient mausoleum crypts of Egyptian royalty, serving as the necropolis for the ancient Egyptian capital, Memphis. Saqqara contains numerous pyramids, including the Pyramid of Djoser, sometimes referred to as the Step Pyramid, and a number of mastaba tombs. Located some 30 km (19 mi) south of modern-day Cairo, Saqqara covers an area of around 7 by 1.5 km (4.3 by 0.9 mi).

Saqqara contains the oldest complete stone building complex known in history, the Pyramid of Djoser, built during the Third Dynasty. Another sixteen Egyptian kings built pyramids at Saqqara, which are now in various states of preservation. High officials added private funeral monuments to this necropolis during the entire Pharaonic period. It remained an important complex for non-royal burials and cult ceremonies for more than 3,000 years, well into Ptolemaic and Roman times.

North of the Saqqara site lies the Abusir pyramid complex, and to its south lies the Dahshur pyramid complex, which together with the Giza Pyramid complex to the far north comprise the Pyramid Fields of Memphis, or the Memphite Necropolis, which was designated as a World Heritage Site by UNESCO in 1979.

Some scholars believe that the name Saqqara is not derived from the ancient Egyptian funerary deity, Sokar, but from a local Berber tribe called the Beni Saqqar, even though a tribe of this name is not documented anywhere. Medieval authors also refer to the village as Ard as-Sadr (Arabic: ارض السدر, lit. 'land of the buckthorn').

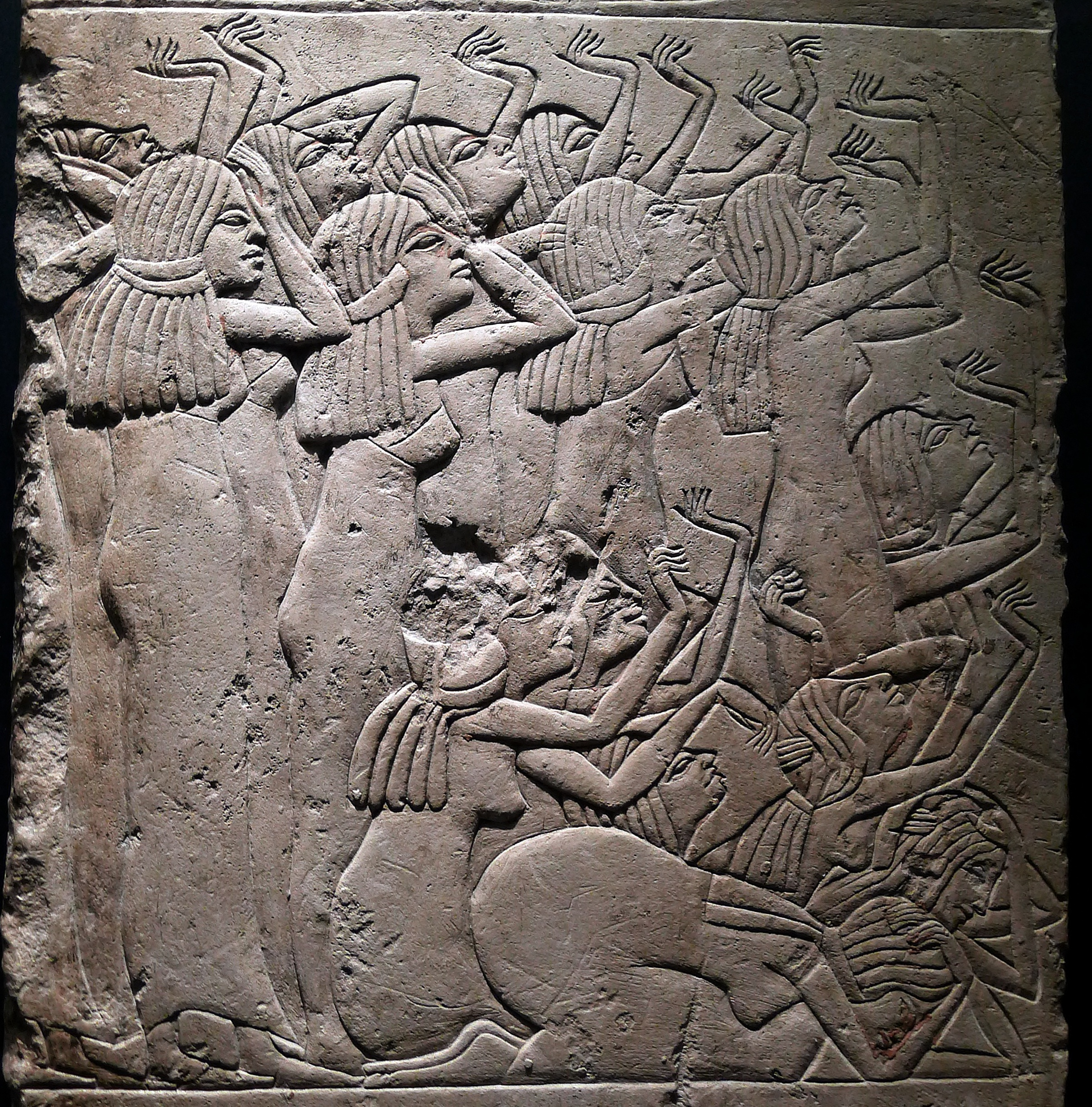
Relief from tomb (Louvre)

== History ==
=== Early Dynastic ===
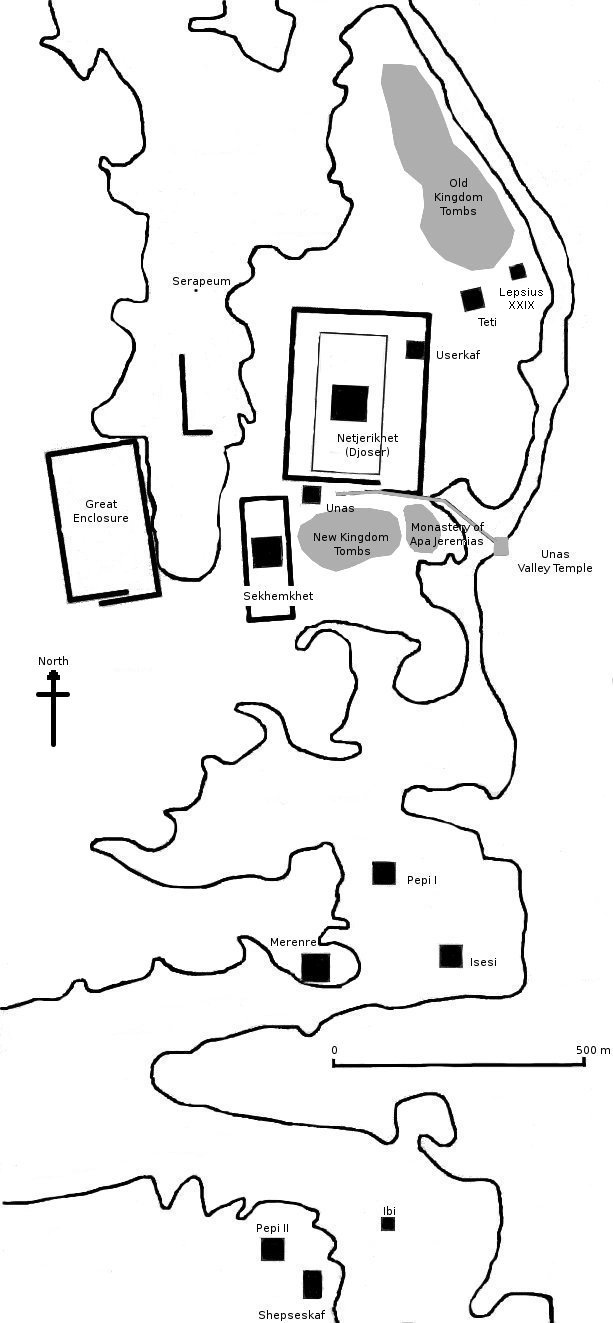
Map of the site

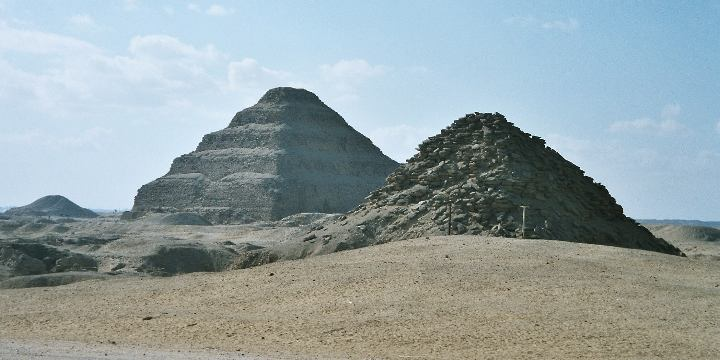
View of Saqqara necropolis, including Djoser's step pyramid (centre), the Pyramid of Unas (left) and the Pyramid of Userkaf (right)

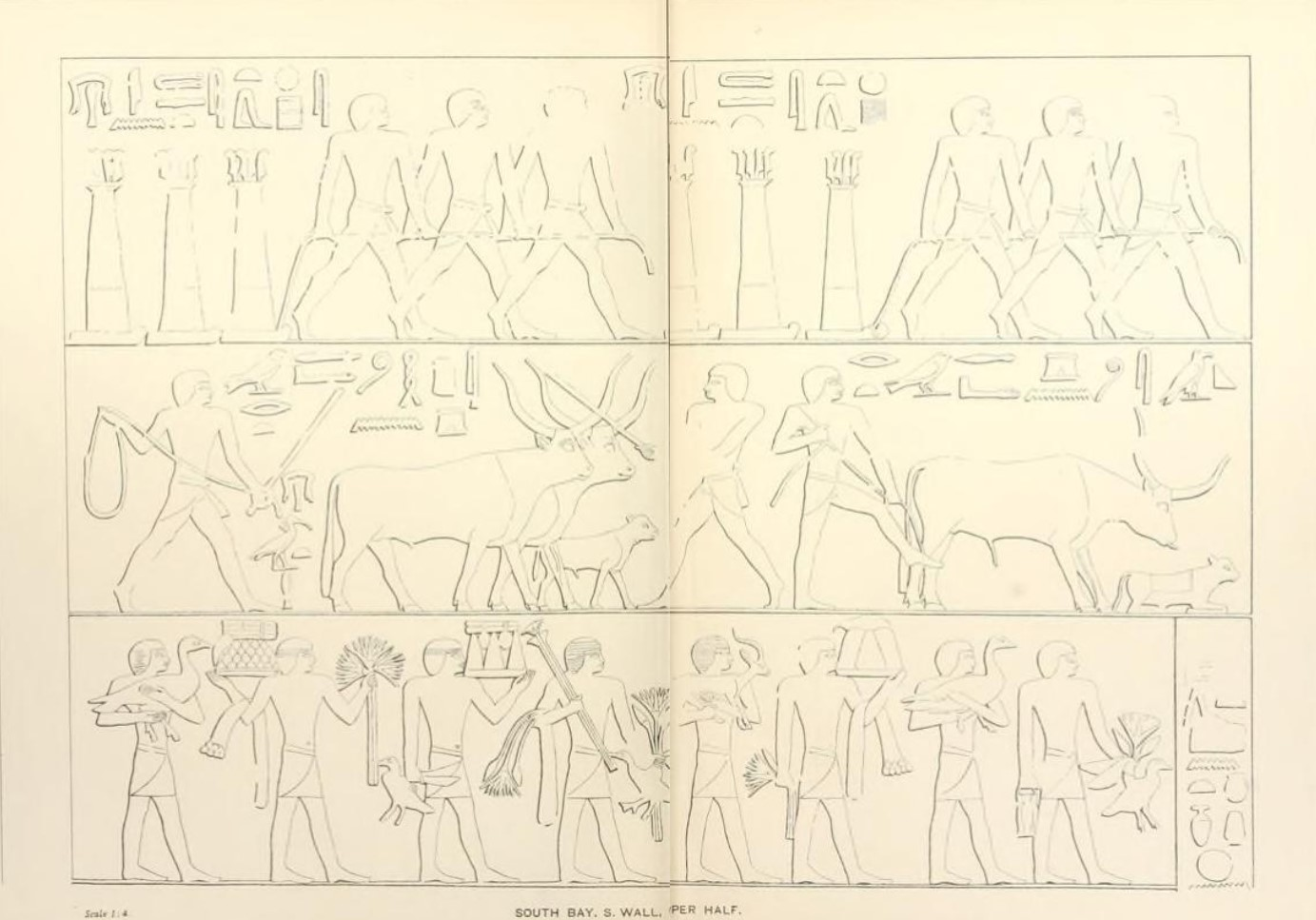

The earliest burials of nobles can be traced back to the First Dynasty, at the northern side of the Saqqara plateau. During this time, the royal burial ground was at Abydos. The first royal burials at Saqqara, comprising underground galleries, date to the early Second Dynasty reigns of Hotepsekhemwy, Raneb and Nynetjer. This is followed by a hiatus, with Seth-Peribsen and Khasekhemwy, the last Second Dynasty king, both buried in Abydos. Khasekhemwy may nonetheless also have built a funerary monument at Saqqara consisting of a large rectangular enclosure, known as Gisr el-Mudir, although this enclosure could also belong to Nynetjer. It probably inspired the monumental enclosure wall around the Step Pyramid complex. Djoser's funerary complex, built by the royal architect Imhotep, further comprises a large number of dummy buildings and a secondary mastaba (the so-called 'Southern Tomb'). French architect and Egyptologist Jean-Philippe Lauer spent the greater part of his life excavating and restoring Djoser's funerary complex.

==== Early Dynastic monuments ====
- Tomb of king Hotepsekhemwy and Nebra
- Tomb of king Nynetjer
- Buried Pyramid, funerary complex of king Sekhemkhet
- Gisr el-Mudir, funerary complex of a Second Dynasty king, possibly Nynetjer or Khasekhemwy
- Step Pyramid, funerary complex of king Djoser

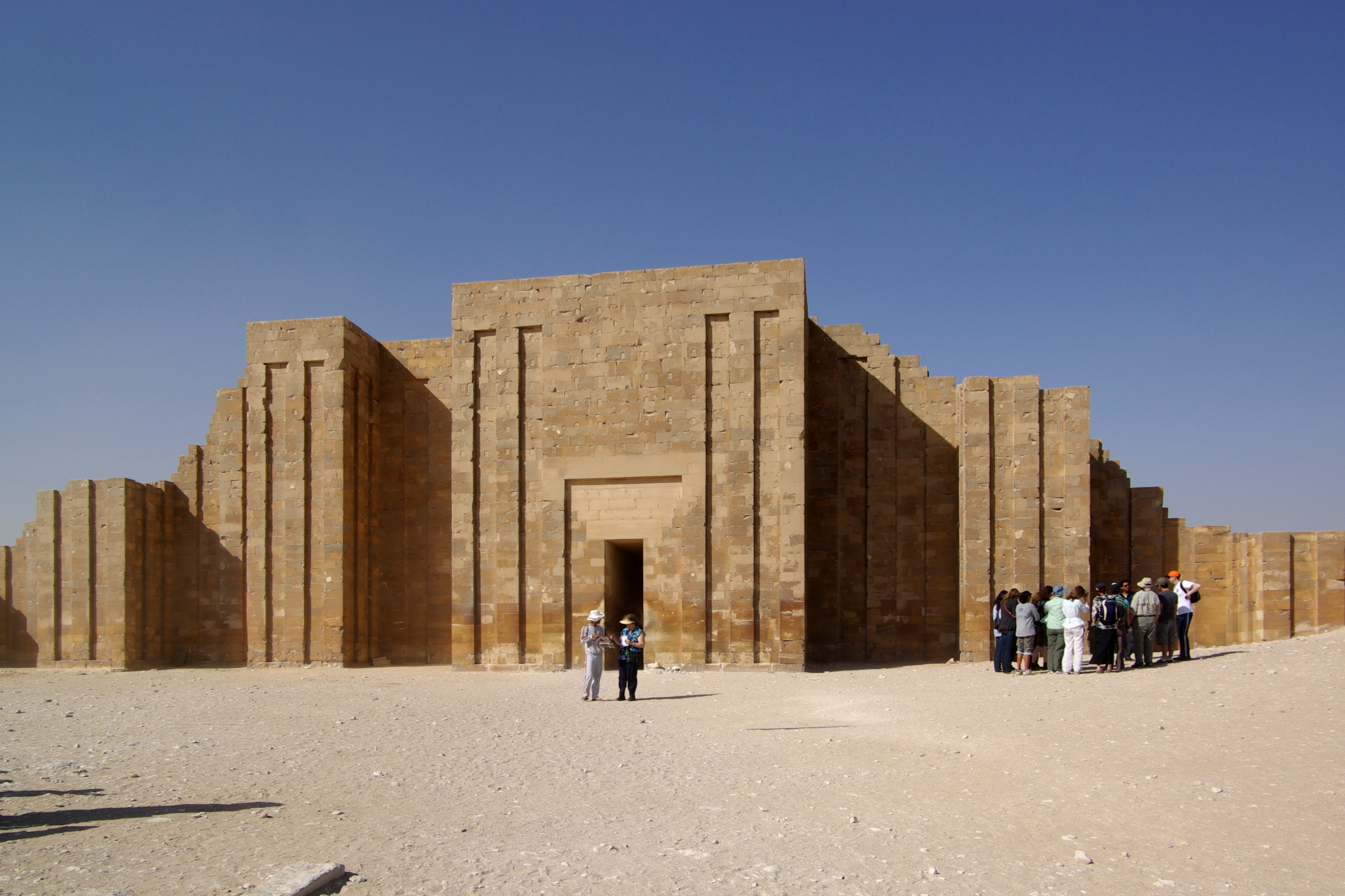
Funerary complex of Djoser

=== Old Kingdom ===
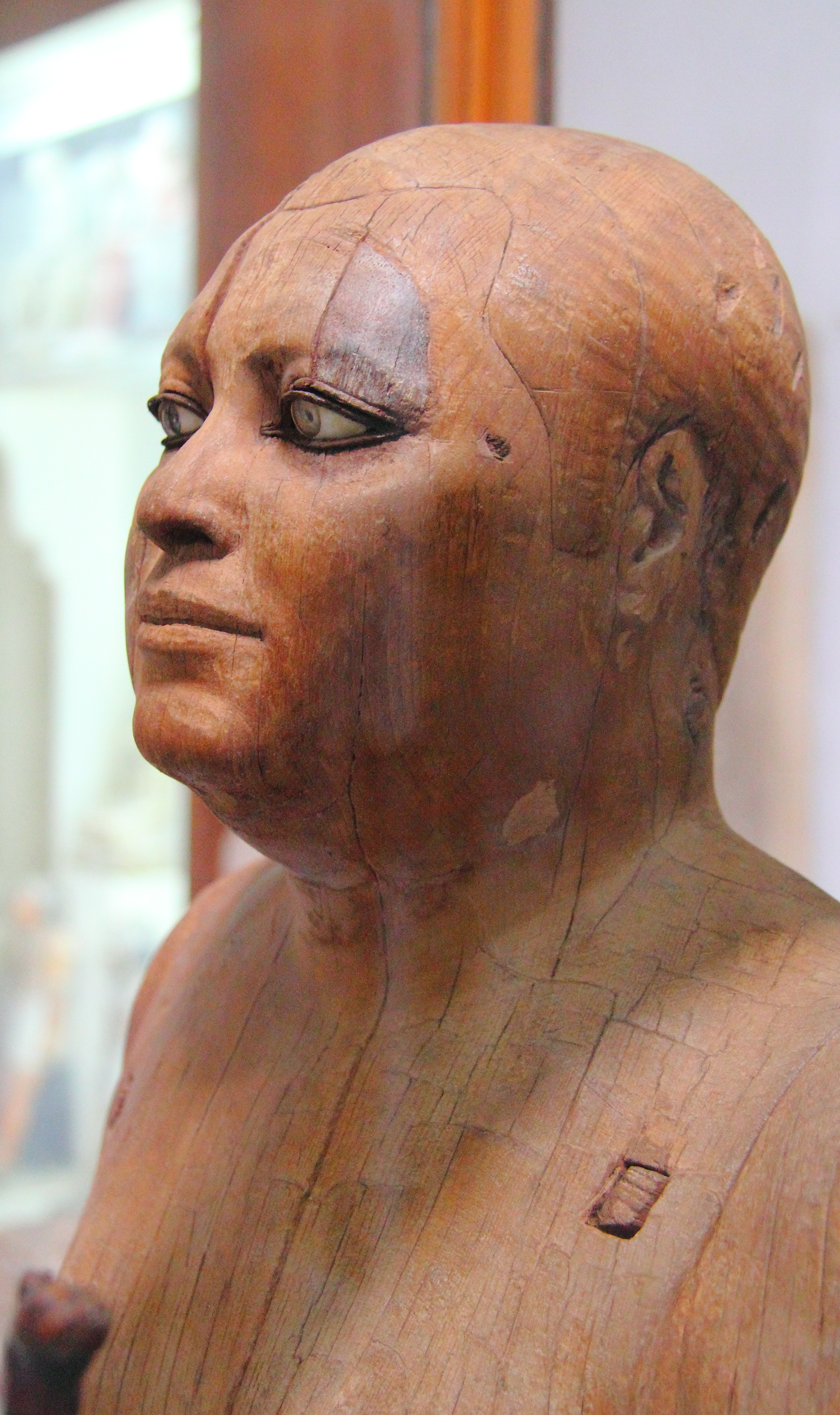
Wooden statue of the scribe Kaaper, 4th or 5th dynasty of the Old Kingdom, from Saqqara, c. 2500 BC

Nearly all Fourth Dynasty kings chose a different location for their pyramids. During the second half of the Old Kingdom, under the Fifth and Sixth Dynasties, Saqqara was again the royal burial ground. The Fifth and Sixth Dynasty pyramids are not built wholly of massive stone blocks, but instead with a core consisting of rubble. Consequently, they are less well preserved than the world-famous pyramids built by the Fourth Dynasty kings at Giza. Unas, the last ruler of the Fifth Dynasty, was the first king to adorn the chambers in his pyramid with Pyramid Texts. During the Old Kingdom, it was customary for courtiers to be buried in mastaba tombs close to the pyramid of their king. Thus, clusters of private tombs were formed in Saqqara around the pyramid complexes of Unas and Teti.

==== Old Kingdom monuments ====
- Pyramid of Djoser (Dynasty Three)
- Mastabat al-Fir'aun, tomb of king Shepseskaf (Dynasty Four)
- Pyramid of Userkaf of the Fifth Dynasty
- Pyramid of Djedkare Isesi
- Pyramid of king Menkauhor
- Mastaba of Ti
- Mastaba of Khnumhotep and Niankhkhnum
- Pyramid of Unas
- Mastaba of Ptahhotep
- Pyramid of Teti (Dynasty Six)
- Mastaba of Mereruka
- Mastaba of Kagemni
- Mastaba of Akhethetep
- Pyramid of Pepi I
- Pyramid of Merenre
- Pyramid complex of king Pepi II Neferkare
- Tomb of Perneb (now in the Metropolitan Museum of Art of New York)
- Tomb of Henu
- Mastaba of Sabu

==== First Intermediate Period monuments ====
- Pyramid of king Ibi (Dynasty Eight)

=== Middle Kingdom ===
From the Middle Kingdom onward, Memphis was no longer the capital of the country, and kings built their funerary complexes elsewhere. Despite the political power shifting to Thebes, Memphis has remained an important artistic and commercial center. Few private monuments from this period have been found at Saqqara.

==== Second Intermediate Period monuments ====
- Pyramid of king Khendjer (Dynasty Thirteen)
- Pyramid of an unknown king

=== New Kingdom ===
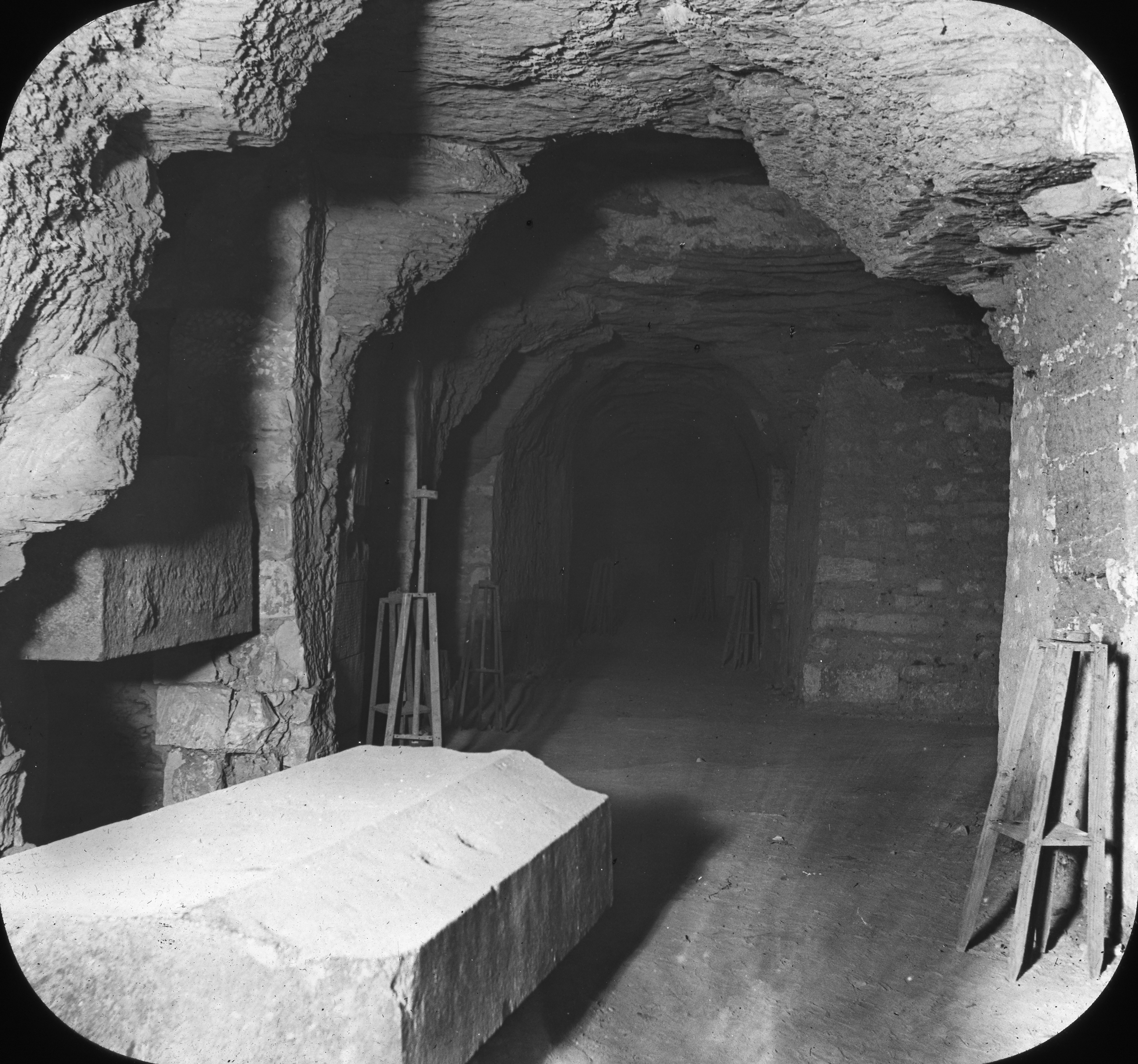
Apis Tombs of the Serapeum of Saqqara, passage with recesses that house sarcophagi for the bulls

During the New Kingdom, Memphis was an important administrative and military centre, being the capital after the Amarna Period. From the Eighteenth Dynasty onward, many high officials built tombs at Saqqara. While still a general, Horemheb built a large tomb here, although he later was buried as pharaoh in the Valley of the Kings at Thebes. Other important tombs belong to the vizier Aperel, the vizier Neferronpet, the artist Thutmose, the priest Bakenhori and the wet-nurse of Tutankhamun, Maia.

Many monuments from earlier periods were still standing, but dilapidated by this period. Prince Khaemweset, son of Pharaoh Ramesses II, made repairs to buildings at Saqqara. Among other things, he restored the Pyramid of Unas and added an inscription to its south face to commemorate the restoration. He enlarged the Serapeum, the burial site of the mummified Apis bulls, and was later buried in the catacombs. The Serapeum, containing one undisturbed interment of an Apis bull and the tomb of Khaemweset, were rediscovered by the French Egyptologist Auguste Mariette in 1851.

==== New Kingdom monuments ====
- Several clusters of tombs of high officials, among which the tombs of Horemheb and of Maya and Merit. Reliefs and statues from these two tombs are on display in the National Museum of Antiquities at Leiden, the Netherlands, and in the British Museum, London.

=== After the New Kingdom ===
During the periods after the New Kingdom, when several cities in the Delta served as capital of Egypt, Saqqara remained in use as a burial ground for nobles. Moreover, the area became an important destination for pilgrims to a number of cult centres. Activities sprang up around the Serapeum, and extensive underground galleries were cut into the rock as burial sites for large numbers of mummified ibises, baboons, cats, dogs, and falcons.

==== Monuments of the Late Period, the Graeco-Roman and later periods ====
- Several shaft tombs of officials of the Late Period
- Serapeum (the larger part dating to the Ptolemaic Period)
- The so-called 'Philosophers circle', a monument to important Greek thinkers and poets, consisting of statues of Hesiod, Homer, Pindar, Plato, and others (Ptolemaic)
- Several Coptic monasteries, among which the Monastery of Apa Jeremiah (Byzantine and Early Islamic Periods)

== Site looting during 2011 protests ==
Saqqara and the surrounding areas of Abusir and Dahshur suffered damage by looters during the 2011 Egyptian protests. Store rooms were broken into, but the monuments were mostly unharmed.

== Archaeology ==
In 1842 and 1843, as part of a Prussian expedition, Karl Richard Lepsius studied, mapped, and reported on the remains at Saqqara. The expedition was the first to systematically number the monuments at Saqqara.

From 1851 until 1855 Auguste Mariette excavated at Saqqara, discovering the Serapeum. He returned to Egypt as Director of Antiquities in 1858 and worked periodically at Saqqara until his death in 1881. Under the remaining Directors in the 1900s, Gaston Maspero and Jacques de Morgan the focus at Saqqara, as in the rest of Egypt, was on uncovering monuments in support of tourism.

Alessandro Barsanti excavated here between 1899 and 1901.

Saqqara was excavated between 1905 and 1914 by James Edward Quibell. One of the excavation reports was delayed until 1927. Cecil Mallaby Firth, collaborating with Quibell, excavated at the site in the 1920s until his death.

The Egypt Exploration Society worked at Saqqara, primarily in North Saqqara, in the 1950s and 1960s with excavations led by Walter B. Emery, Geoffrey T. Martin, and Harry Smith.

== Recent discoveries ==
=== 2010s ===
During routine excavations in 2011 at the dog catacomb in Saqqara necropolis, an excavation team led by Salima Ikram and an international team of researchers led by Paul Nicholson of Cardiff University uncovered almost eight million animal mummies at the burial site next to the sacred temple of Anubis. It is thought that the mummified animals, mostly dogs, were intended to pass on the prayers of their owners to their deities.

In July 2018, a German-Egyptian research team headed by Ramadan Badry Hussein of the University of Tübingen reported the discovery of an extremely rare gilded burial mask that probably dates from the Saite-Persian period in a partly damaged wooden coffin. The last time a similar mask was found was in 1939. The eyes were covered with obsidian, calcite, and black hued gemstone possibly onyx. "The finding of this mask could be called a sensation. Very few masks of precious metal have been preserved to the present day, because the tombs of most Ancient Egyptian dignitaries were looted in ancient times." said Hussein.

In September 2018, several dozen cache of mummies dating 2,000 years back were found by a team of Polish archaeologists led by Kamil Kuraszkiewicz from the Faculty of Oriental Studies of the University of Warsaw. The Polish-Egyptian expedition works under the auspices of the Polish Centre of Mediterranean Archaeology University of Warsaw. Investigations were carried out for over two decades in the area to the west of the Djoser Pyramid. The most important discoveries include the tomb of vizier Merefnebef with a funerary chapel decorated with multi-colored reliefs, which was uncovered in 1997. as well as the tomb of courtier Nyankhnefertem uncovered in 2003. The expedition also explored two necropoles. Archaeologists revealed several dozen graves of noblemen from the period of the 6th Dynasty, dating to the 24th–21st century BC, and 500 graves of indigent people dating approximately to the 6th century BC – 1st century AD. Most of the bodies were poorly preserved and all organic materials, including the wooden caskets, had decayed. The tombs discovered most recently (in 2018) form part of the younger, so-called Upper Necropolis.

Most of the mummies we discovered last season were very modest, they were only subjected to basic embalming treatments, wrapped in bandages and placed directly in pits dug in the sand

— Kamil Kuraszkiewicz.

The research of the Polish-Egyptian expedition also focuses on the interpretation of the so-called Dry Moat, a vast trench hewn around the Djoser Pyramid. The most recent discoveries confirm the hypothesis that the Dry Moat was a model of the pharaoh's journey to the netherworld, a road the deceased ruler had to follow to attain eternal life.

In November 2018, an Egyptian archaeological mission located seven ancient Egyptian tombs at the ancient necropolis of Saqqara. Three of the tombs were used for cats, some dating back to the Fifth and Sixth Dynasties, while one of four other sarcophagi was unsealed. Among the dozens of cat mummies were 100 wooden and gilded statues of cats and one in bronze dedicated to the cat goddess Bastet, and funerary items dating back to the 12th Dynasty. Another of the seven tombs belongs to Khufu-Imhat, the overseer of buildings in the royal palace.

Also in November 2018, a collection of rare mummified scarab beetles was unearthed in two sarcophagi, one of which was decorated with paintings of large black beetles.

Also in November 2018, the Egyptian government announced the discovery at Saqqara of a previously unknown 4,400-year-old tomb. It belongs to Wahtye, a high-ranking priest who served under King Neferirkare Kakai during the Fifth Dynasty, and his wife, four children and mother. The tomb is about 33 feet (10 meters) long by 10 feet (3.0 meters) wide and has five burial shafts and a basement. It contains more than fifty sculptures, and is painted with scenes of the family, wine and pottery making, musical performances, sailing, hunting, and furniture making.

On 13 April 2019, an expedition led by a member of the Czech Institute of Egyptology, Mohamed Megahed, discovered a 4,000-year-old tomb near Egypt's Saqqara Necropolis. Archaeologists confirmed that the tomb belonged to an influential person named Khuwy, who lived in Egypt during the 5th Dynasty. "The L-shaped Khuwy tomb starts with a small corridor heading downwards into an antechamber and from there a larger chamber with painted reliefs depicting the tomb owner seated at an offerings table", reported Megahed. Some paintings maintained their brightness over a long time in the tomb. Mainly made of white limestone bricks, the tomb had a tunnel entrance generally typical for pyramids. Archaeologists say that there might be a connection between Khuwy and pharaoh because the mausoleum was found near the pyramid of Egyptian Pharaoh Djedkare Isesi, who ruled during that time.

In October 2019, a cache of 30 coffins with mummies was discovered, at the time Egypt's largest in more than a century and the first cache to be discovered by a solely Egyptian mission. The coffins were stacked on top of each other and arranged in two rows about three feet below the sandy surface. The first coffin's head was partially exposed in the sand, which led to the cache's discovery. Two of the coffins belonged to children, a rare occurrence in archeology. Mostafa Waziri, secretary general of the Supreme Council of Antiquities, explained that one could identify the mummy's gender by the shape of the hands on the coffin, open hands being female and hands balled into fists being male. The colors of the coffin inscriptions---made from limestone, red oak, turquoise, and other natural stones mixed with eggwhites—stayed intact, and the mixture of egg yolk and candle wax spread over the coffins to make them shine was still visible, making this a unique find.

=== 2020s ===
On April 28, 2020, archeologists announced they had found a 30-foot-deep (9 meter) burial shaft containing five limestone sarcophagi, four wooden coffins with human mummies, and an array of other artifacts. Among them were 365 faience ushabti and a small wooden obelisk about 40 centimeters tall that had been painted with depictions of Horus, Isis and Nepthys.

In September 2020, a 36-foot (11-meter) deep burial shaft revealed almost 30 sarcophagi that had remained completely sealed since their interment.

On 3 October 2020, Khalid el-Anany, Egypt's tourism and antiquities minister announced the discovery of at least 59 sealed sarcophagi with mummies more than 2,600 years old. Archaeologists also revealed the 20 statues of Ptah-Soker and a carved 35-centimeter tall bronze statue of god Nefertem.

On 19 October 2020, the Ministry of Tourism and Antiquities announced the discovery of gilded, wooden statues and more than 80 coffins in three burial shafts. Officials believed the coffins contain senior officials and priests from the 26th Dynasty.

In November 2020, archaeologists unearthed more than 100 delicately painted wooden coffins dating to the 26th Dynasty and 40 statues of the local god Ptah-Soker. Other artifacts discovered include funeral masks, canopic jars and 1,000 ceramic amulets. “This discovery is very important because it proves that Saqqara was the main burial of the 26th Dynasty,” said Zahi Hawass, an Egyptologist and Egypt's former Minister of State for Antiquities Affairs.

In January 2021, the tourism and antiquities ministry announced the discovery of more than 50 wooden sarcophagi in 52 burial shafts which date back to the New Kingdom period, each around 30 to 40 feet deep, and a 13 ft-long papyrus that contains texts from Chapter 17 of the Book of the Dead. The papyrus scroll belonged to a man named Bu-Khaa-Af, whose name is written on it, on his sarcophagus, and on four ushabtis. Excerpts from the Book of the Dead were also painted onto the surface of other coffins. Also found in the shafts were wooden funerary masks, board games, a shrine dedicated to god of the dead Anubis, bird-shaped artifacts and a bronze axe. A limestone stelae dated to the reign of Ramesses II was found in one of the shafts, depicting the overseer of the king's military chariot Kha-Ptah and his wife Mwt-em-wia worshipping Osiris and sitting with six of their children.

Also in January 2021, a team of archaeologists led by Zahi Hawass found the funerary temple of Naert or Narat and three warehouses made of bricks attached to the southeastern side for storage of temple provisions, offerings and tools. Researchers also revealed that Narat's name was engraved on a fallen obelisk near the main entrance. Previously unknown to researchers, Naert was a wife of Teti, the first king of the sixth dynasty.

In November 2021, archeologists from Cairo University discovered several tombs, including that of Ptahemwia, chief treasurer during the reign of Ramesses II, and of a military leader named Hor Mohib.

In March 2022, five 4000-year-old tombs belonging to senior officials from the Old Kingdom and First Intermediary Period were discovered. On 30 May 2022, 250 sarcophagi and 150 statuettes were displayed at Saqqara, dated back to the Late Period more than 2,500 years ago, in addition to a 9-meter-long papyrus scroll which could be a depiction of a chapter of the Book of the Dead.

In May 2022, the discovery of the nearly 4,300-year-old tomb of an ancient Egyptian high-ranked person who handled royal, sealed documents of pharaoh was announced. According to University of Warsaw’s Polish Centre of Mediterranean Archaeology, the elaborately decorated tomb belonged to a man named Mehtjetju who served as a priest and an inspector of the royal property. Kamil O. Kuraszkiewicz, expedition director stated that Mehtjetju most likely lived at about the same time, at some point during the reigns of the first three rulers of the Sixth Dynasty: Teti, Userkare and Pepy I.

In January 2023, Zahi Hawass announced the discovery of four tombs at Saqqara including a 4,300-year-old mummy to a man named Hekashepes covered with gold, in addition to finds date back to the 5th and 6th dynasties, such as a priest inspector named Khnumdjedef, secret keeper called Meri and a judge and writer named Fetek.

In April 2024, a rock-cut tomb dating back to the Second Dynasty was uncovered in Saqqara by a team of Japanese and Egyptian archaeologists. The tomb contained artifacts from various periods, spanning over the Late Period, the Ptolemaic period, and the 18th Dynasty. Among the findings were remains of an adult with a colored mask and a small child, in addition to two terracotta statues depicting Isis and Harpocrates.

In April 2025, archaeologists led by Dr. Zahi Hawass uncovered the tomb of Prince Waser-If-Re, son of Userkaf, the founder of Egypt's Fifth Dynasty. The tomb features a pink granite false door, measuring 4.5 meters in height and 1.15 meters in width, inscribed with the prince's titles, including "Hereditary Prince," "Royal Scribe," "Vizier," and "Chanting Priest". According to the archaeologists, this is the first discovery of such a large pink granite false door at Saqqara, signifying the prince's high status.

== See also ==
- Bubasteum
- List of Egyptian pyramids
- Saqqara Bird
- Saqqara Tablet
- Secrets of the Saqqara Tomb, 2020 documentary
- Inebu-hedj, the nome in ancient lower egypt that the city was located
