= Mafdet =

Ancient Egyptian goddess of protection against snakes and scorpions

Name in hieroglyphs
U2 ir f d t Sms G7

Genealogy
- Parents: Ra, Atum
- Siblings: Tefnut, Shu

Mafdet (also Mefdet, Maftet) was a goddess in the ancient Egyptian religion. She was often depicted wearing a skin of a cheetah, and protected against the bite of snakes and scorpions. She was part of the pantheon of ancient Egyptian deities that was prominent during the First Dynasty of Egypt. She was prominent during the reign of pharaoh Den whose image appears on stone vessel fragments from his tomb and is mentioned in a dedicatory entry in the Palermo Stone. Mafdet was the deification of legal justice, or possibly of capital punishment. She was associated with the protection of the king's chambers and other sacred places, and with protection against venomous animals, which were seen as transgressors against Maat. In the Pyramid Texts of the Old Kingdom of Egypt, she was mentioned as the slayer of snakes and the goddess closely associated with the king. She is described as the protectress of the sun god Ra from venomous snakes.

== Roles in Egypt ==
Mafdet defended Ra from threats during his daily voyage. She would hunt by night (earning the epithet "Piercer of Darkness") and ensure the coming of dawn.

When Osiris was separated into pieces, Mafdet protected him while she helped bind the pieces together.

Depictions in royal tombs associate the symbol of Mafdet with the symbol of Anubis, suggesting that Mafdet accompanied the gods as a hunter or executioner while Anubis fulfilled his role as messenger and attendant.

== Art ==
In art, Mafdet was alternately shown as a feline or mongoose, a woman with such a head, or such an animal with the head of a woman. The type of feline varies but is commonly interpreted as a cheetah or serval.

She also was depicted in her animal form running up the side of an executioner's staff of office. It was said that Mafdet ripped out the hearts of wrong-doers, delivering them to the pharaoh's feet like cats that present humans with rodents or birds they have killed or maimed.

During the New Kingdom, Mafdet was seen as ruling over the judgment hall in Duat where the enemies of the pharaoh were decapitated with Mafdet's claw.

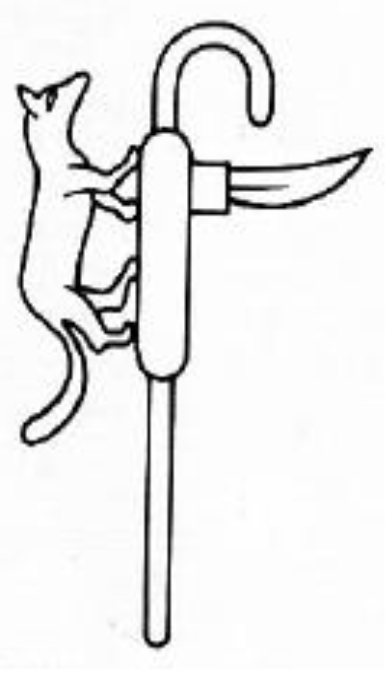
Mafdet symbol on a sceptre
