= Iunmutef =

Egyptian god and form of Horus

- Ritual rebirth, purification, and the protection of the royal ka
- Iunmutef depicted wearing his characteristic side lock of youth and leopard-skin robe.
- Other names: Horus-Iunmutef, Her-iunmutef
Name in hieroglyphs
O28 G43 M22 X1 I9
- Symbol: Leopard-skin robe, side lock of youth, iwn (pillar)
- Parents: Osiris (father) and Isis (mother)

Iunmutef (spelled Iwn-mwt.f; translating to "Pillar of His Mother"), also known as Horus-Iunmutef or Her-iunmutef, was an ancient Egyptian deity and an aspect of the god Horus. His role as the loving son who cares for his deceased father, Iunmutef's primary function was to support the divine ruler and maintain Maat (the cosmic order).

Early Egyptologists interpreted Iunmutef simply as a title for a human mortuary priest or sem-priest, however modern Scholars such as Ute Rummel define Iunmutef as an entity who serves as the godly equivalent to the earthly sem-priest, assisting the king through phases of ritual rebirth, such as the Opening of the Mouth ceremony.

== History ==
Since Iunmutef was considered an aspect of the god Horus, he was depicted either as fully human (left) or with the head of a falcon

=== Old Kingdom ===
The earliest historical attestations of the Iunmutef date to the end of the Fifth Dynasty. In the archaeological record, the god's name first emerges within an administrative framework rather than a mythological one. In the Saqqara tomb of the official Raemka, a list of royal estates or nomes contains the name of an estate called "the Work of Iunmutef". This source directly links the deity to the 9th Upper Egyptian nome. A known block belonging to Pepi I, discovered at Bubastis, illustrates an early depiction of the Iunmutef. He is explicitly mentioned in the Pyramid Texts within Spell 587 (§§ 1593a, 1603a).

=== Middle Kingdom ===
During the Middle Kingdom, Iunmutef became known within the Coffin Texts, appearing prominently in multiple spells including CT Spell 280, CT Spell 294, and CT Spell 945 .These texts identified him as the "loving son" who guards, assists, and provides ritual care to his deceased father, transitioning the deceased into the realm of Osiris. He appears as a core component in religious festivals such as the Sed festival. He also appears in the decoration and textual programs of private tombs.

=== New Kingdom ===
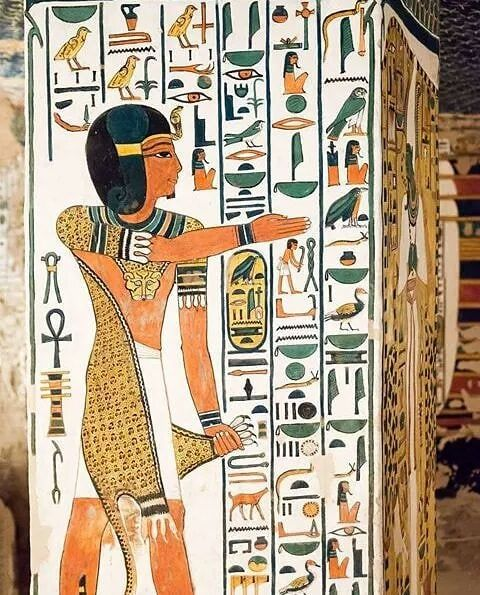
Iunmutef in tomb of Nefertari.

During the New Kingdom, representations of Iunmutef increased significantly across royal monuments, temples, and tombs. In texts and iconography, he was viewed as the physical manifestation of the royal ka. The 19th Dynasty introduced the explicit name "Horus-Iunmutef" to emphasize his role as an aspect of Horus, the loving son who maintained cosmic order (Maat) between the living king and the deceased Osiris. In New Kingdom art, Iunmutef is consistently shown wearing a leopard-skin robe, a ceremonial beard, and the sidelock of youth. Occasionally, he is depicted with the head of a falcon, but this is very rare. New Kingdom texts explicitly define him as a god in his own right. While early 20th-century scholars like James Henry Breasted and Aylward M. Blackman interpreted these figures as priests wearing masks, modern structural analyses show that texts in the tomb of Seti I feature Iunmutef directly declaring, "I am your beloved Horus".

Some Kings took the role Iunmutef or sem priest before ascending the throne as Thutmose II. Queen Tyti is also shown as a Iunmutef in her tomb.

== Role ==
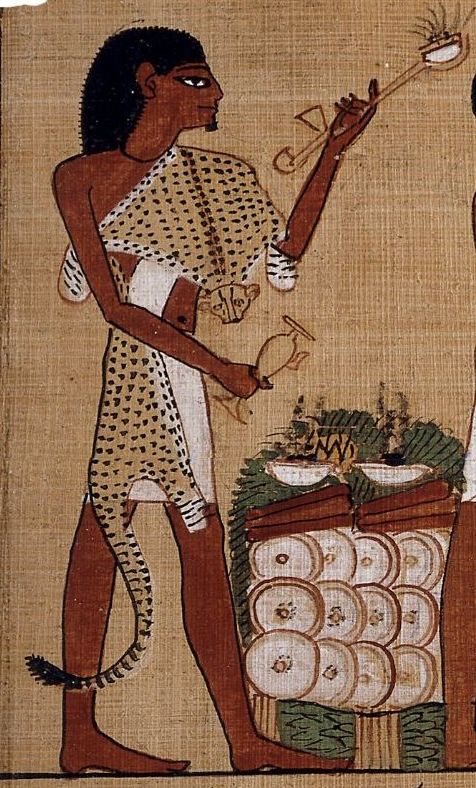
A sem priest in role of Iunmutef performing opening of the mouth

Iunmutef assisted the deceased and performed essential ritual services required to help him in the afterlife. He performed Opening of the Mouth ceremony, which was necessary bring the deceased senses for the afterlife.

== See also ==
- Anubis
- Ihy
