= Seshat =

Ancient Egyptian deity

- Seshat, depicted in a leopard skin with her emblem above her head, inscribing the years of reign for the king on a palm-leaf rib (hieroglyph for "year").
Name in hieroglyphs
R20 t B1
- Symbol: Leopard skin, tablet, star, Cannabis flower, stylus
- Parents: Thoth and Maat
- Consort: Thoth

Seshat (Ancient Egyptian: 𓋇𓏏𓁐, romanized: sšꜣt, lit. 'Female Scribe', under various spellings (Note: Including Safkhet, Sesat, Seshet, Sesheta, and Seshata.)) was the ancient Egyptian goddess of time, surveying, and record-keeping. She was believed to be the creator of writing, specifically the act of engraving or carving hieroglyphs. Her primary duty was recording the pharaoh's regnal years on a palm rib. She was variously depicted as the consort, daughter, or feminine counterpart of Thoth, the god of learning and writing.

== History ==
Seshat is attested from at least the First Dynasty of Egypt. However, the antiquity of her symbols, such as the notched palm rib— a method of recording information that predated writing— suggests that she likely originated earlier than the First Dynasty. Examples of her emblem, or related symbols, have been found as early as the Predynastic Period. Her ancient age was emphasized by her epithet 'The Primeval One'.

The first time her priests and image are definitively referenced is during the Old Kingdom period, where she was shown on the Palermo Stone stele during the reign of the pharaoh Den. She was also mentioned in the Pyramid Texts, where she was identified as an aspect of the goddess Nephthys, and is invoked as the 'Lady of Builders'. In funerary contexts, she was described as restoring the limbs of the deceased alongside Nephthys. Seshat was first visually depicted as early as the Second Dynasty, where she was shown performing the 'stretching the cord' ritual with the pharaoh Khasekhemwy. Seshat continued to be depicted and referenced until at least the Ptolemaic Dynasty.

Seshat was closely associated with Thoth (Ancient Egyptian: Ḏḥwtj), the Egyptian god of wisdom, knowledge, scribes, and the moon. She was variously depicted as his consort, daughter, or feminine counterpart. Depending on the source, either Seshat or Thoth was considered to be the creator of hieroglyphs: the writing system of the ancient Egyptians. This is supported by her epithet 'The One Who Started Carving/Marking'. However, Seshat was not considered a scribe in the traditional sense, and she was likely something more akin to an accountant or "tally-keeper". Specifically, she was the goddess of 'notching', 'carving', or 'engraving'— methods used to write on temple walls or other architecture. Conversely, Thoth may have presided over writing on papyrus.

=== Worship ===
While Seshat originally had her own priests, they gradually disappeared, and the last pharaoh known to have made offerings to her is Senusret I. One priest of note was a prince from the Fourth Dynasty, Wep-em-nefret, who was noted her priest on a slab stela from his tomb. She was not worshipped by the general populace and did not have a dedicated cult or temple of her own. However, her role in the 'stretching the cord' ritual would have involved her in the founding of every temple.

== Iconography ==
In ancient Egyptian art, she was depicted as a woman with a seven-pointed emblem positioned above her head or extending from a headband. This emblem was the origin of an alternate name for Seshat that emerged during the Middle Kingdom period, Sefkhet-Abwy, (Note: Also spelled Sefkhet-Abut, Sefkhet-Abwi, and Sefekhet-Abuy.) which can be translated as 'Seven-Horned' or 'She Who Has Laid Aside the Horns'.

Seshat was commonly shown wearing a dress or a leopard-skin; sometimes a robe would be layered underneath the skin. The leopard-skin may serve as evidence of her pre-dynastic origins, as the fashion gradually died out after the Old Kingdom period ended. However, it did survive in ceremonial contexts.

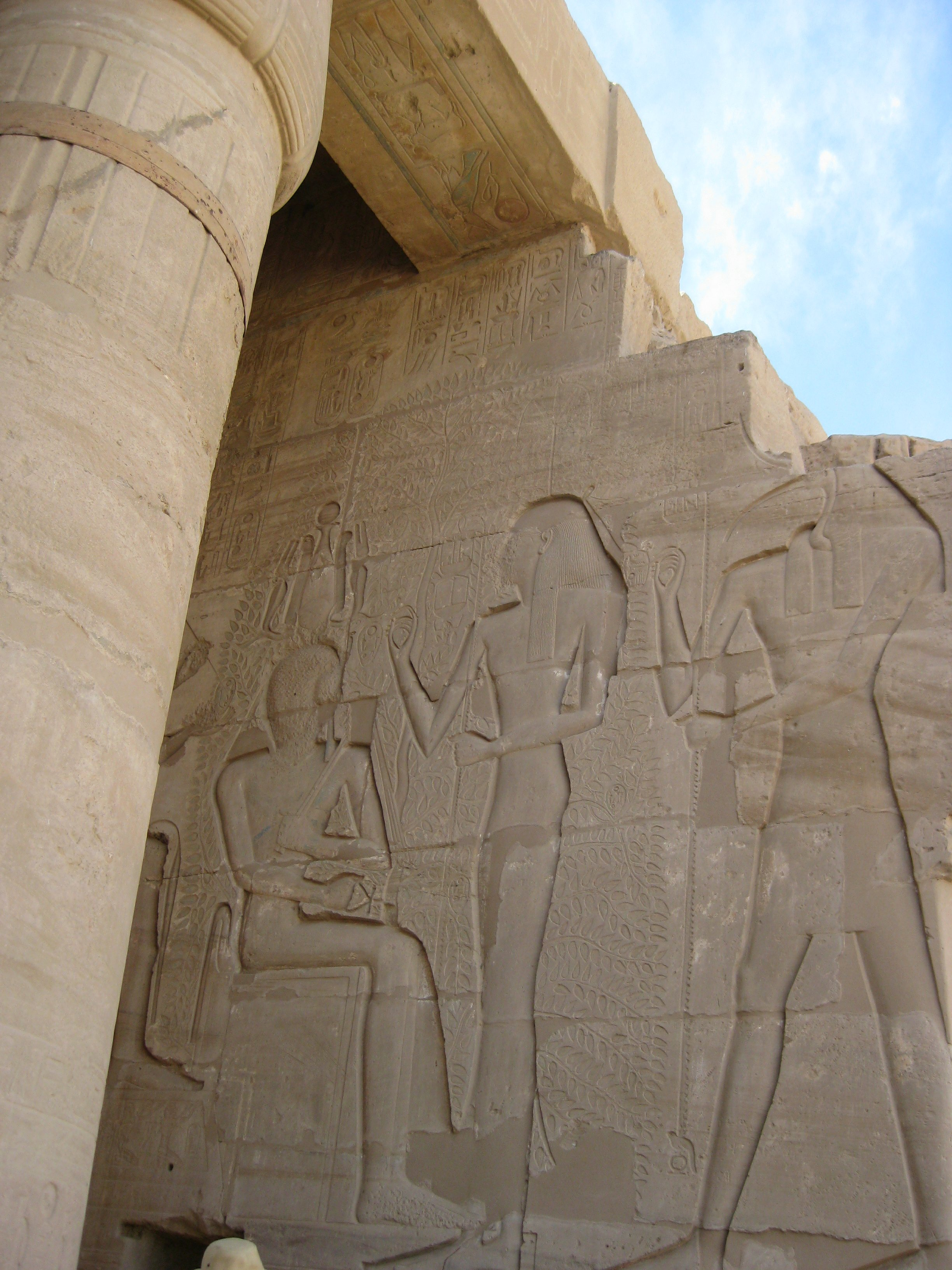
Depiction of Seshat, Thoth, and Atum (not pictured) writing on the fruit of the sacred persea or ished tree. Sunken relief from the Ramesseum, mortuary temple of Ramesses II (c. 1303–1213 BC).

Typically Seshat was shown holding a notched palm rib, the hieroglyph for "year". The rib was often depicted ending in a tadpole above a shen ring, representing 100,000 and infinity, respectively. Depictions of Seshat often showed her notching the rib to record the passage of time with one hand, and writing down the pharaoh's regnal years with the other. When Seshat was depicted recording festivals, hieroglyphs representing them were shown suspended from the rib. She was also often depicted holding other tools such as the knotted cords that were stretched to survey land and structures in ancient Egypt.

== Roles ==
Seshat was a goddess primarily associated with the passage of time and record-keeping. While she was originally worshipped as an important goddess with her own priests at Memphis and festivals, her influence gradually waned, and her role became one of attendance to the pharaoh. Her primary role was recording the pharaoh's life, regnal years, and jubilees on a palm rib or sacred ished tree. Additionally, ancient Egyptians may have believed Seshat determined the pharaoh's lifespan and fate. When a new pharaoh was crowned, she recorded their new royal title and the speech that they gave. Thoth was sometimes depicted assisting Seshat in these activities. By the New Kingdom, Seshat's duties expanded to include granting the pharaoh the right to celebrate Sed festival, a ceremony attested since the Early Dynastic Period. Also called the Heb Sed, the festival celebrated the pharaoh's reign, typically after thirty years of rule.

Additionally, Seshat recorded the names of royal children at birth on the ished (persea) tree, a role that gave her the epithet 'Before the House of the Books of the Royal Offspring'. As early as the Old Kingdom, Seshat was depicted recording the goods, loot, and captives brought to Egypt, especially those gained in military campaigns. From the Middle Kingdom onwards, she was depicted recording foreign tribute given to Egypt. She was also depicted conducting cattle censuses.

=== Divine surveyor ===
Seshat was involved in surveying and planning prior to the construction of structures; however, she did not oversee the actual construction of buildings, as this domain belonged to gods like Ptah. The 'stretching the cord' ritual, or pedj-sesh(r) ceremony, is one example of her duties. This ritual related to laying out the foundations of temples and other important structures. It would have helped plan dimensions and align structures to astronomic or geographic features while also fixing the ground plan and determining its corners. It involved the use of rope/cord, poles/stakes, and clubs/mallets. Depictions of the ritual typically showed Seshat and a pharaoh standing across from each other, holding these tools, and stretching a knotted cord between them. The god Horus is sometimes depicted alongside them. Text from the Palermo Stone indicates that this festival was performed at least as early as the First Dynasty, and involved her priests.

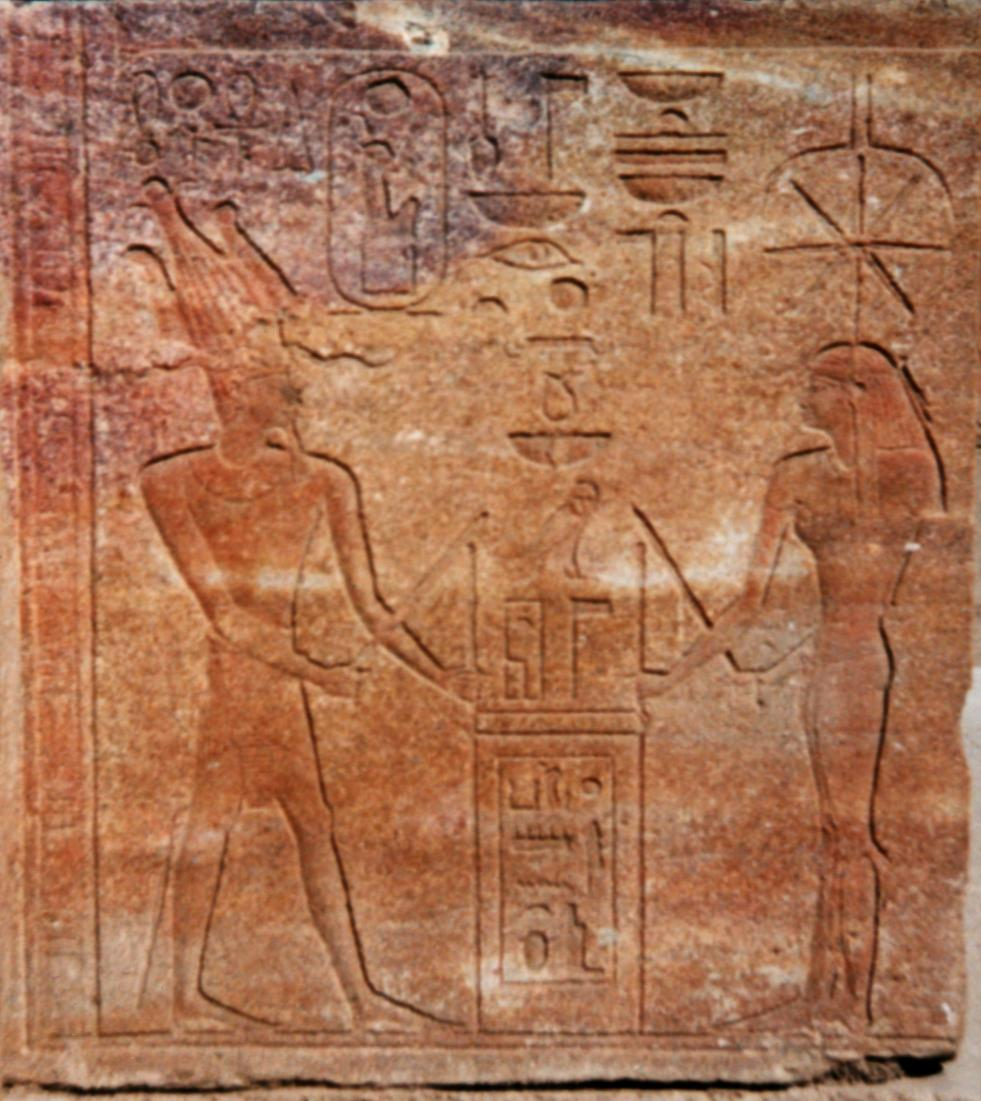
Hatshepsut (c. 1479–1458 BC) and Seshat in a sunken relief at the Red Chapel, depicted performing the "stretching the cord" ritual for the temple's founding.

=== Patroness of libraries ===
Seshat held various titles related to writing, archives, and libraries, including 'Mistress of Scribes', 'Lady of Books', and 'Mistress of the House of Books'. These epithets, and her association with writing, made her a patroness of scribes. She was commonly visually depicted in libraries; she is pictured on a frieze in the library in Edfu, crouching with Thoth next to the pharaoh's cartouches. In ancient Egypt, libraries were generally not open to the public, and instead primarily served as places where theological and scientific texts were written, copied, and stored.

She was a patron of the House of Life— an educational institution and library— since its founding in the Old Kingdom period. She was described as "dwelling in the House of Life", and carried the title 'The Lady of Plans, the Lady of Writings in the House of Life'. The House of Life held religious significance, and may have been seen as a place where humans could commune with gods like Seshat and Thoth; Ramsses IV was described as "excellent of understanding like Thoth, and he hath penetrated into the annals like the maker thereof, having examined the writings of the House of Life". Similarly, an inscription found on the tomb of the chief scribe Amenwashu states he was a "scribe who wrote the annals of the gods and goddesses in the House of Life".

== Emblem ==
R21 R20
The variations of Seshat's emblem
in hieroglyphs

Gardiner: R21 and R20

The Seshat emblem is a hieroglyph representing Seshat. In art, it was shown above her head or as part of her headpiece. It is unclear what the emblem symbolises. It is variably described as a flower, star, or rosette below a crescent, or arc. Alternatively, the emblem may represent a device similar to the Roman groma or a method of identifying directions through the use of gnomons. It was typically drawn with seven points and one "stem" of variable length extending from the bottom. The points of the emblem were depicted with varying shapes and levels of detail, but always remained symmetrical. The emblem may also contain a disc or ring in the centre.

The emblem has two main variations. During the Old Kingdom, the upper arc was depicted as whole with two upright feathers on top (Gardiner R21). By the New Kingdom, the arc was split into two "horns" with upright points replacing the feathers (Gardiner R20). Both variations remained in use throughout the New Kingdom and onwards.

The 24th century BC Palermo Stone, a piece of the Royal Annals of the Old Kingdom stele, has multiple depictions of Seshat's emblem. It occurs twice on the "front" (or recto) side in years 34 and 40 under Den. One of these examples is arranged below, reading approximately: "(Year:) Creating (images of) Seshat and Mafdet." This refers to the creation of the goddesses' cult images, such as statues, as a defining event of the year. (Note: The Unicode font reads left-to-right; the Palermo Stone was written right-to-left. On the stone, a large renpet (or palm rib), the hieroglyph for year, precedes this selection.)

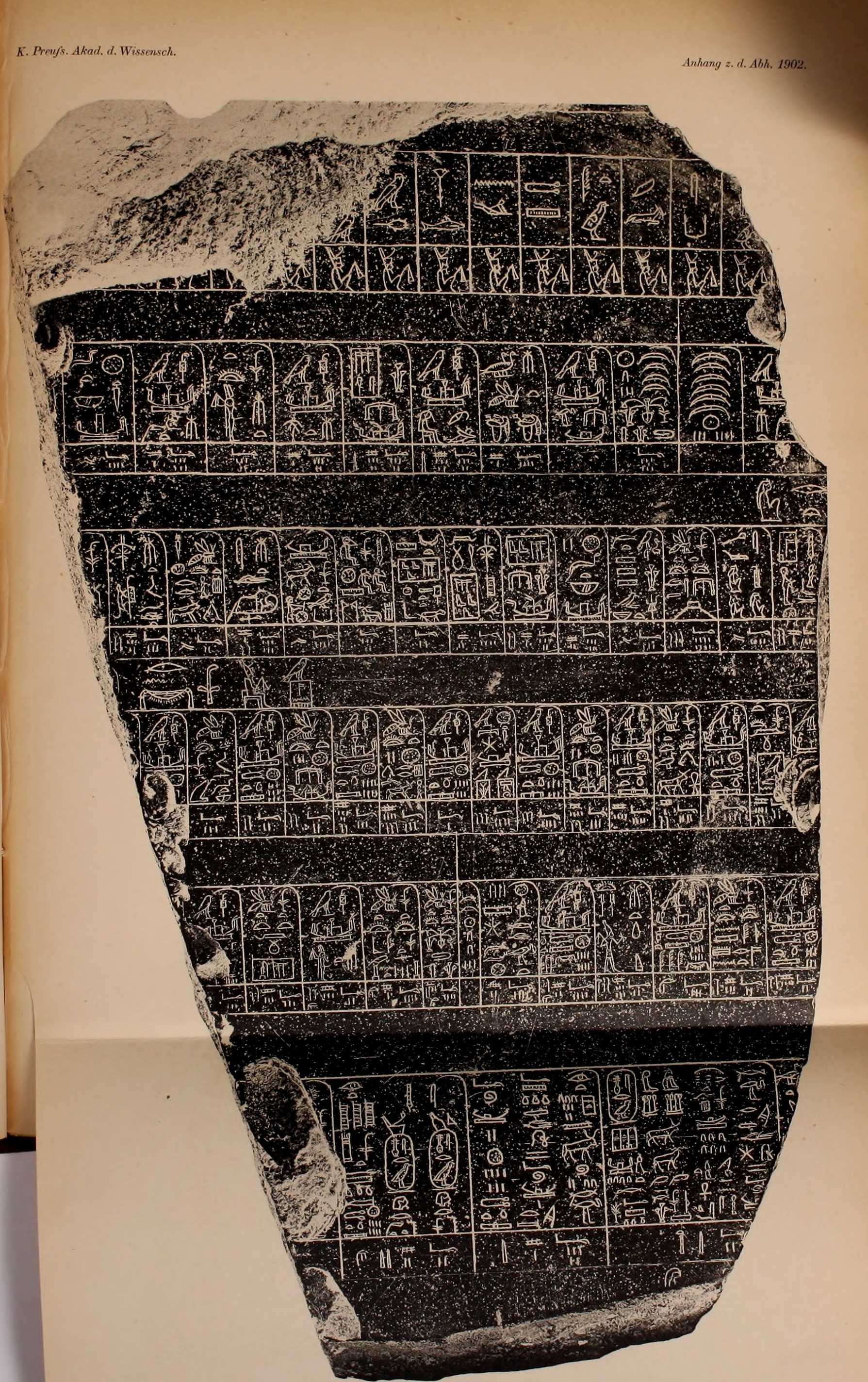
Print of the recto side of the Palermo Stone (c. Fifth Dynasty, 2392–2283 BCE), edited for readability. Seshat's emblem appears twice in the third row down, in the sections 7th and 13th from the right.

The Seshat emblem is also used on the Palermo Stone to represent Seshu, the male counterpart of Seshat.

F31 X1 R21 U1 S39 Z9 Z9 I9 D47 X1 S39 Z9 Z9

== Gallery ==
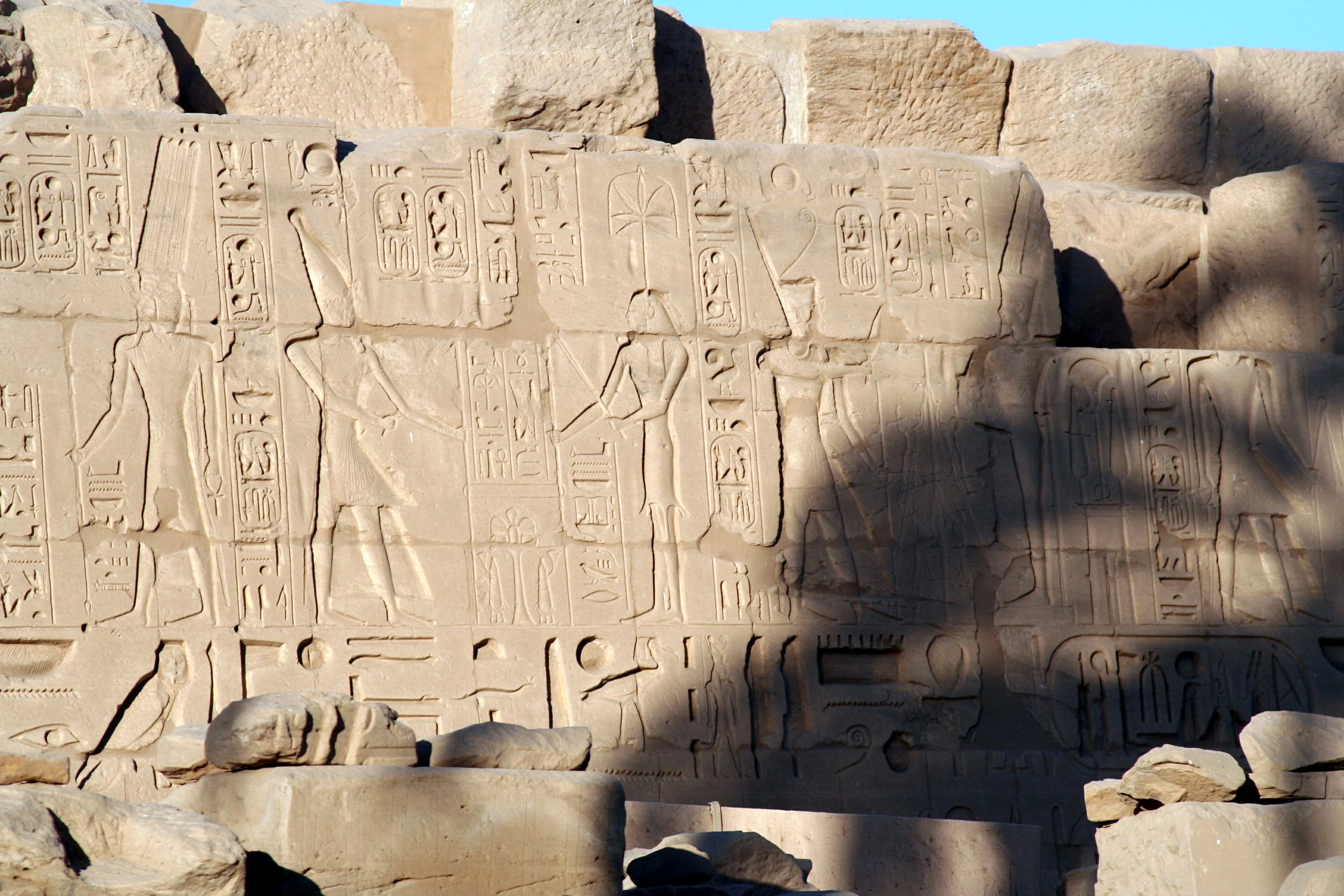
Seshat (third from the left) shown performing the "stretching the cord" ritual with Ramesses II (second from the left). Sunken relief at the Karnak Temple Complex.

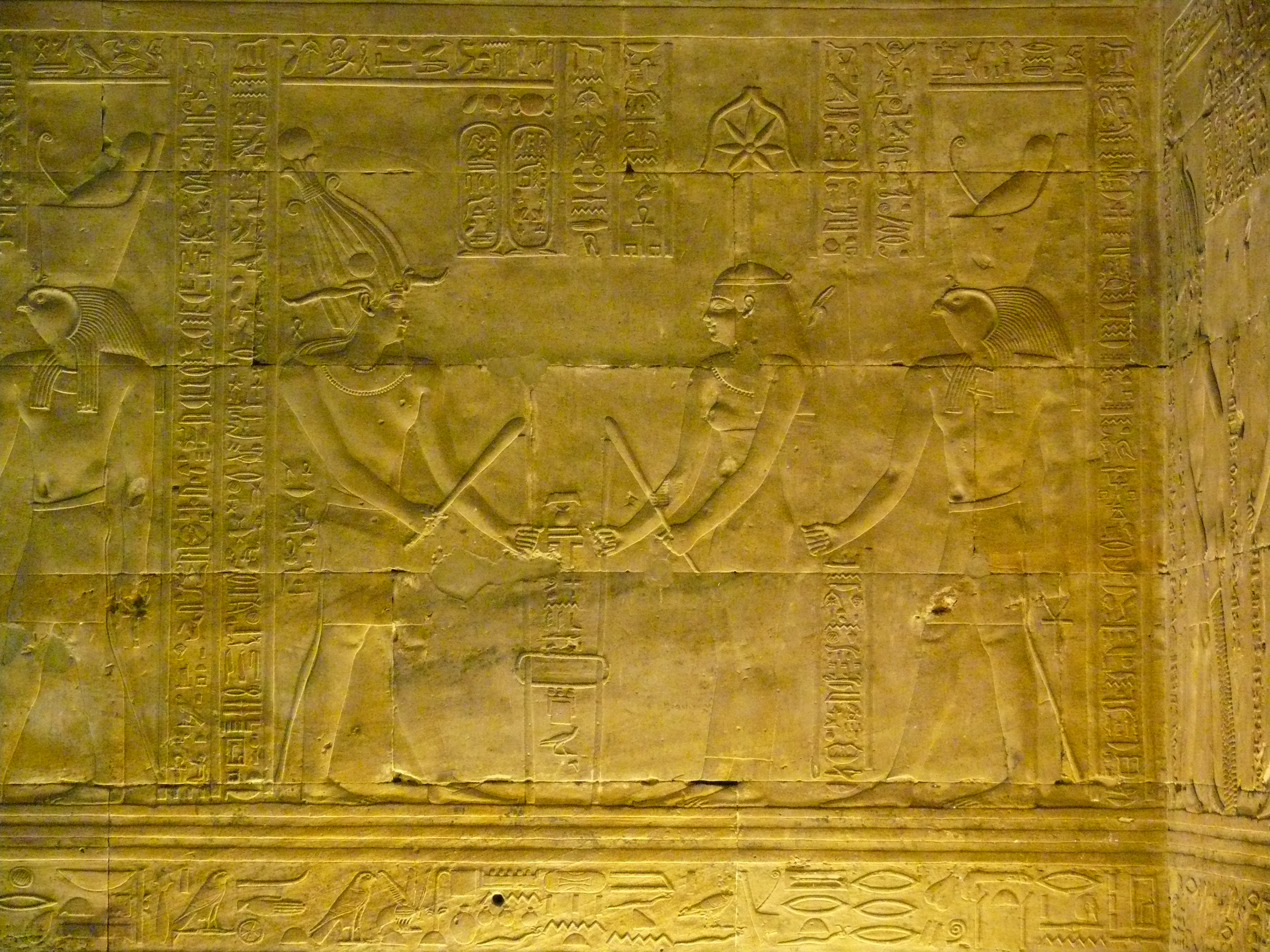
Ptolemy III and Seshat, with Horus alongside, depicted conducting the "stretching of the cord". Bas-relief in the Temple of Edfu (c. 237–57 BC), Ptolemaic dynasty.

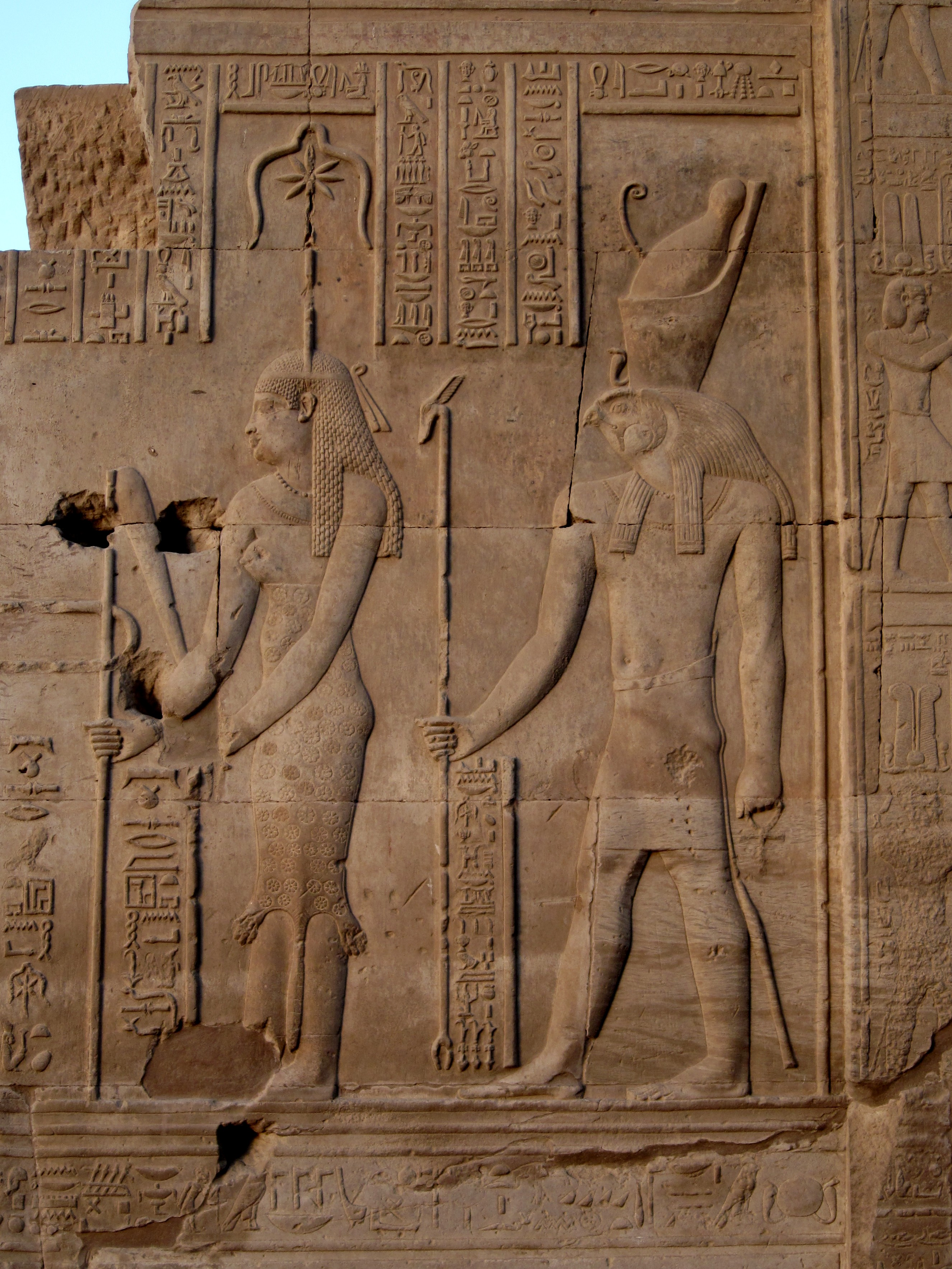
Seshat shown holding the mallet, pole, and rope used in the "stretching the cord" ritual, alongside Horus. Bas-relief at the Temple of Kom Ombo (c. 180–47 BC), Ptolemaic dynasty.

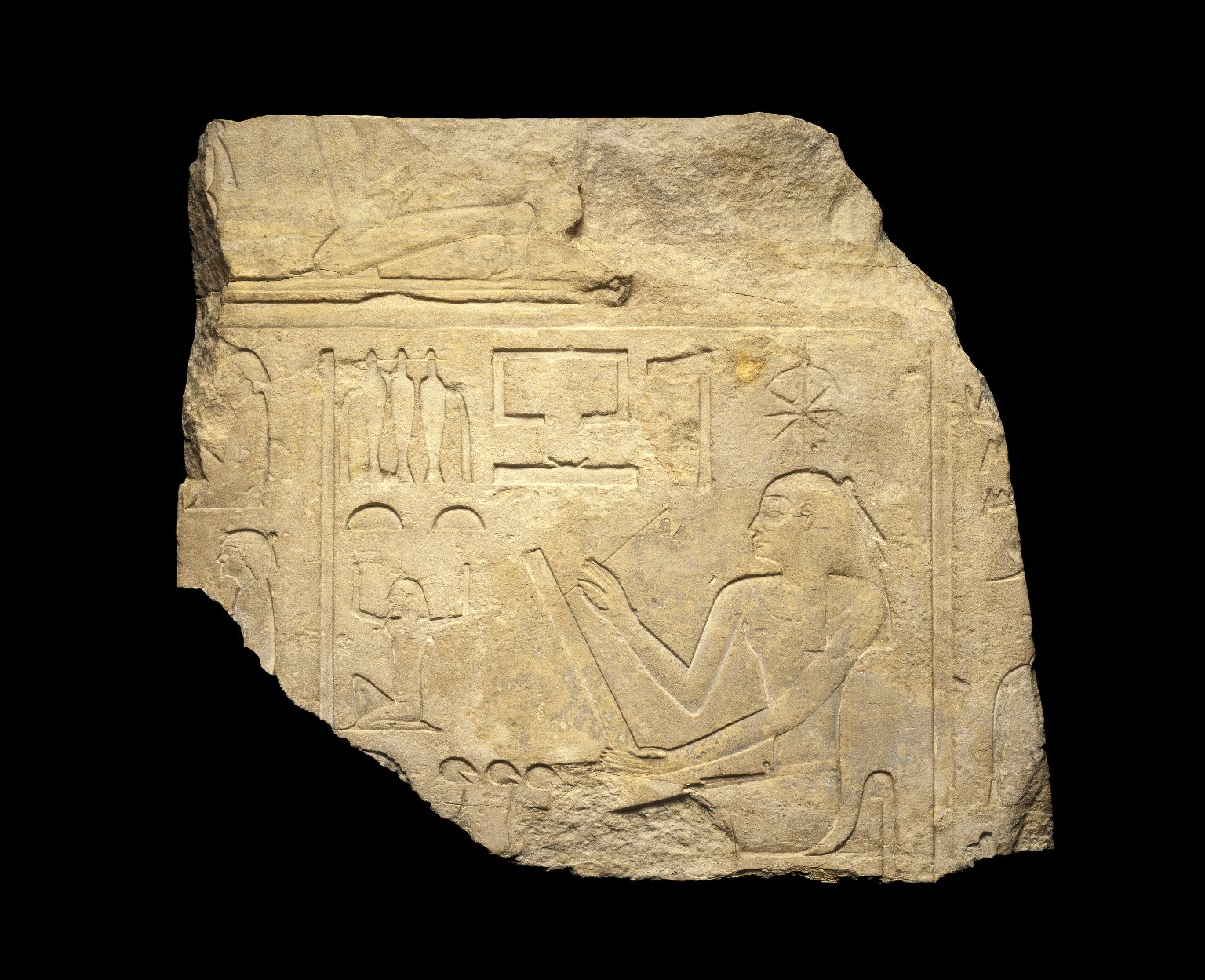
Depiction of Seshat writing. Sunken relief in limestone from the Pyramid Temple of Senusret I (Dynasty 12, c. 1919–1875 BC); copy of a relief made for Pepi II (Dynasty 6, c. 2284–2214 BC).

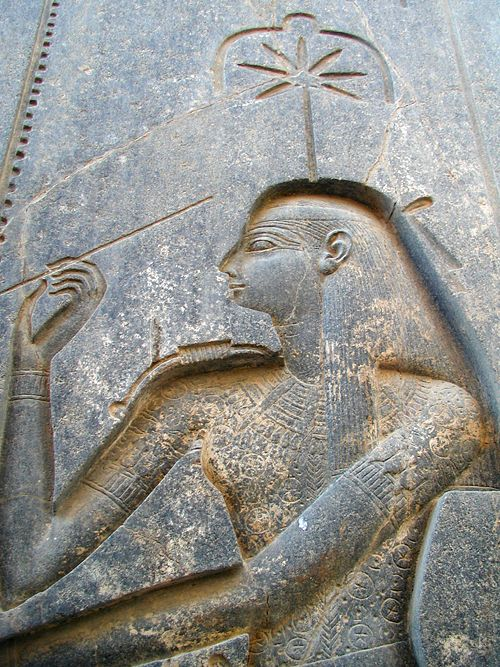
Depiction of Seshat recording the king's life on the palm rib. Thoth (not pictured) is doing likewise across from her. Sunken relief in granite from the back of the throne of the statue of Ramesses II, in the Amun temple at Luxor (c. 1250 BCE).

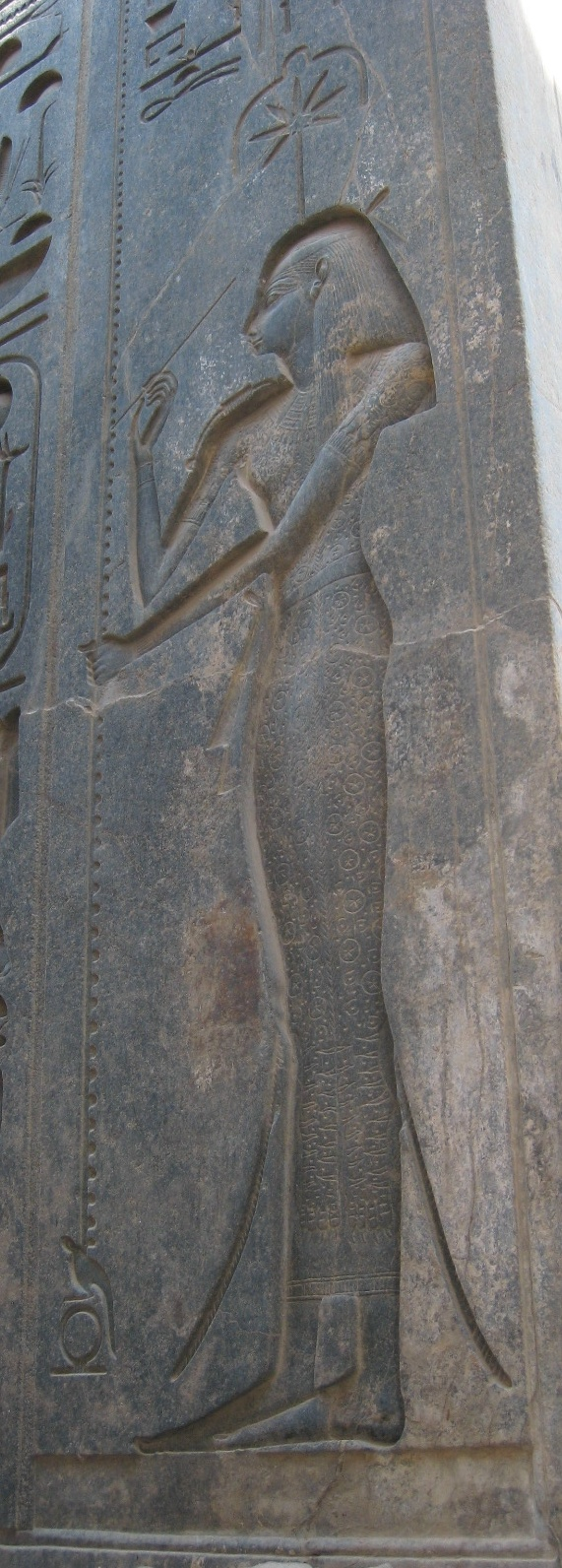
Full length of Seshat from the previous image.

== See also ==
- Seshat's emblem in Gardiner's Sign List
- Scribe equipment hieroglyph
- Maat, Egyptian goddess of truth and the wife of Thoth
- Nisaba, Mesopotamian goddess of writing, scribes, and grain
