= Opening of the mouth ceremony =

Ancient Egyptian funerary rite

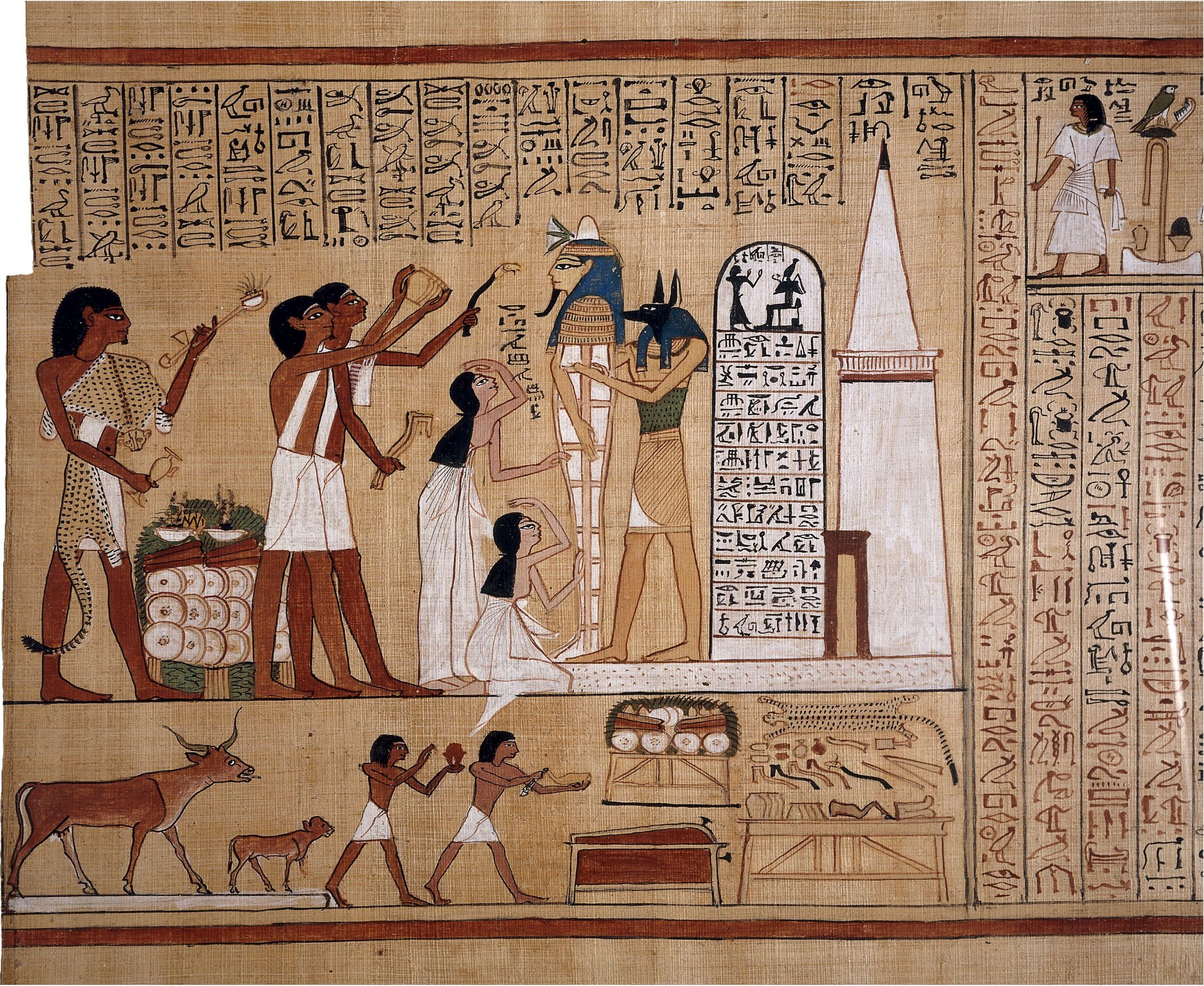
Priests of Anubis, the guide of the dead and the god of tombs and embalming, perform the opening of the mouth ritual. Extract from the Papyrus of Hunefer, a 19th-Dynasty Book of the Dead (c.1300 BCE)

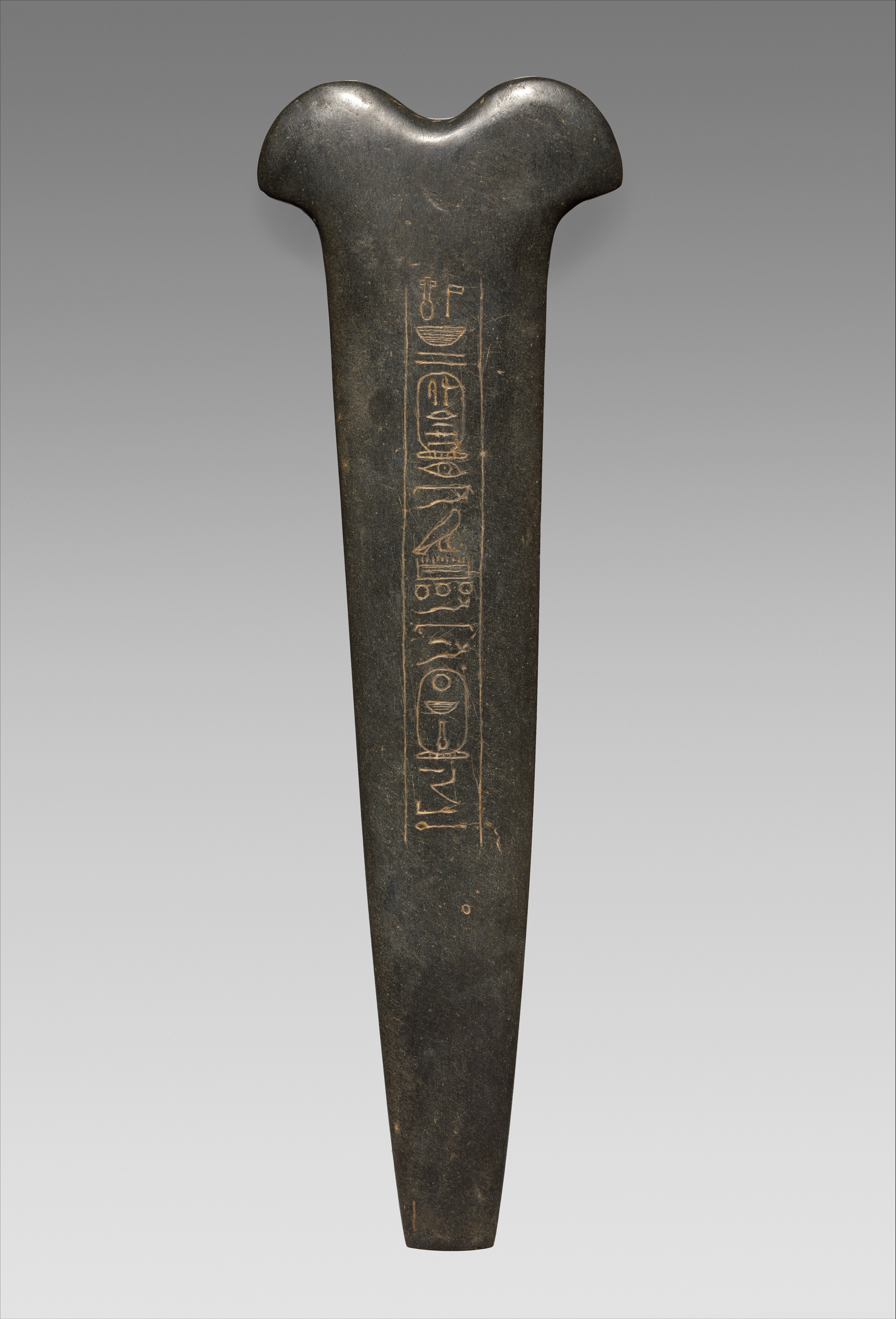
Peseshkef blade dedicated by King Senwosret to Nebhepetre Mentuhotep II MET DP311785

The opening of the mouth ceremony (or ritual) was an ancient Egyptian ritual described in funerary texts such as the Pyramid Texts. From the Old Kingdom to the Roman Period, there is ample evidence of this ceremony, which was believed to give the deceased their fundamental senses to carry out tasks in the afterlife. Various practices were conducted on the corpse, including the use of specific instruments to touch body parts like the mouth and eyes. These customs were often linked with childbirth, which denoted rebirth and new beginnings. For instance, cutting bloody meat from animals as offerings for the deceased signified the birthing process, which typically involves blood, and represented the commencement of a new life. Additionally, tools like the peseshkef, which resembled the tail of a fish and were originally employed for cutting infants' umbilical cords, further emphasized the idea of "rebirth".

== Religious significance ==
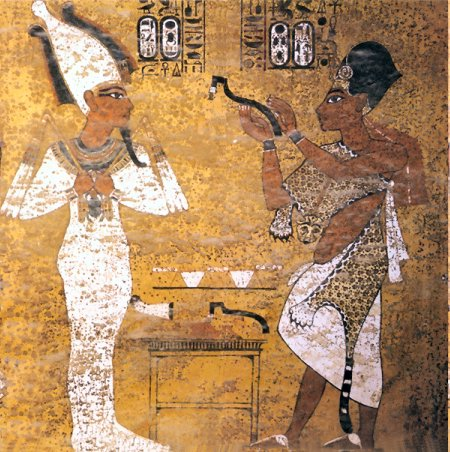
Ay, with a leopard skin, performing the opening of the mouth for Tutankhamun. Wall painting from the Tomb of Tutankhamun (KV 62), 18th Dynasty (c. 1325 BCE)

The ancient Egyptians held the belief that to reach the afterlife, one must pass through a series of arduous trials in the duat, which involve evading perilous creatures and traps. To prepare for these trials, individuals would have special spells and directions inscribed on their sarcophagus on how to avoid such hazards, known as coffin texts.

However, it was necessary for them to possess their basic senses to navigate successfully. The opening of the mouth ceremony was believed to grant their spirits access to these senses and requirements upon death. Vital functions such as breathing, speaking, seeing, eating, and drinking were among these necessities. Moreover, reciting spells and asserting their innocence before the gods after completing the duat required the use of senses such as hearing, seeing, and speaking. As a symbol of rebirth, they were thought to have been given milk, saltwater, and water when entering the underworld, similar to how infants receive milk from their mothers as their initial source of nourishment. Drinking ability was crucial for this purpose.

== Special tools ==
Statues: The ceremony was originally performed on statues, ushabtis, and even temples, but in the Middle and New Kingdoms came to be mainly carried out on mummies. Some texts of the ceremony such as in the tomb of Rekhmire describe this and use the instruments to touch the statue in the appropriate places of its body.

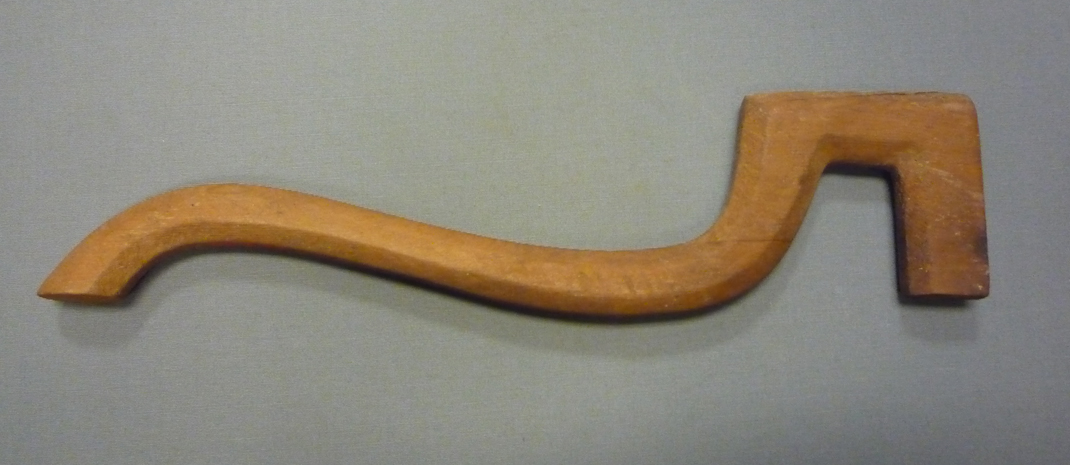
Ritual adze used for touching the mouth and other areas of the body in the ceremony.

Ritual adze: A symbolic adze used for touching the eyes and mouth to restore the individuals senses.

Peseshkef: Believed to mean ‘splitter of his ka-spirit’. These were forked blades made of obsidian, glass, or stone that were created as burial goods. During the Old Kingdom, it is evident that these objects were initially employed to sever umbilical cords during childbirth, a practice that aligns with its spiritual association with rebirth. Nevertheless, the precise ritual in which they were originally intended for during this period remains unclear.

A calf's leg: The leg of a calf was believed to extract the “ba” from the deceased’s body so that it would be able to move freely after death. The “ba” (the personality of the individual) would merge with their “ka”, or life force to form their “akh”. Its use was similar to that of the adze - touching the mouth and other areas of the body. It was also held up to the lips painted on the coffin. It was more prevalent throughout the old kingdom.

Incense: Incense was burned to purify the air as well as create an appeasing smell for the gods during the ceremony.

== Ceremony process ==
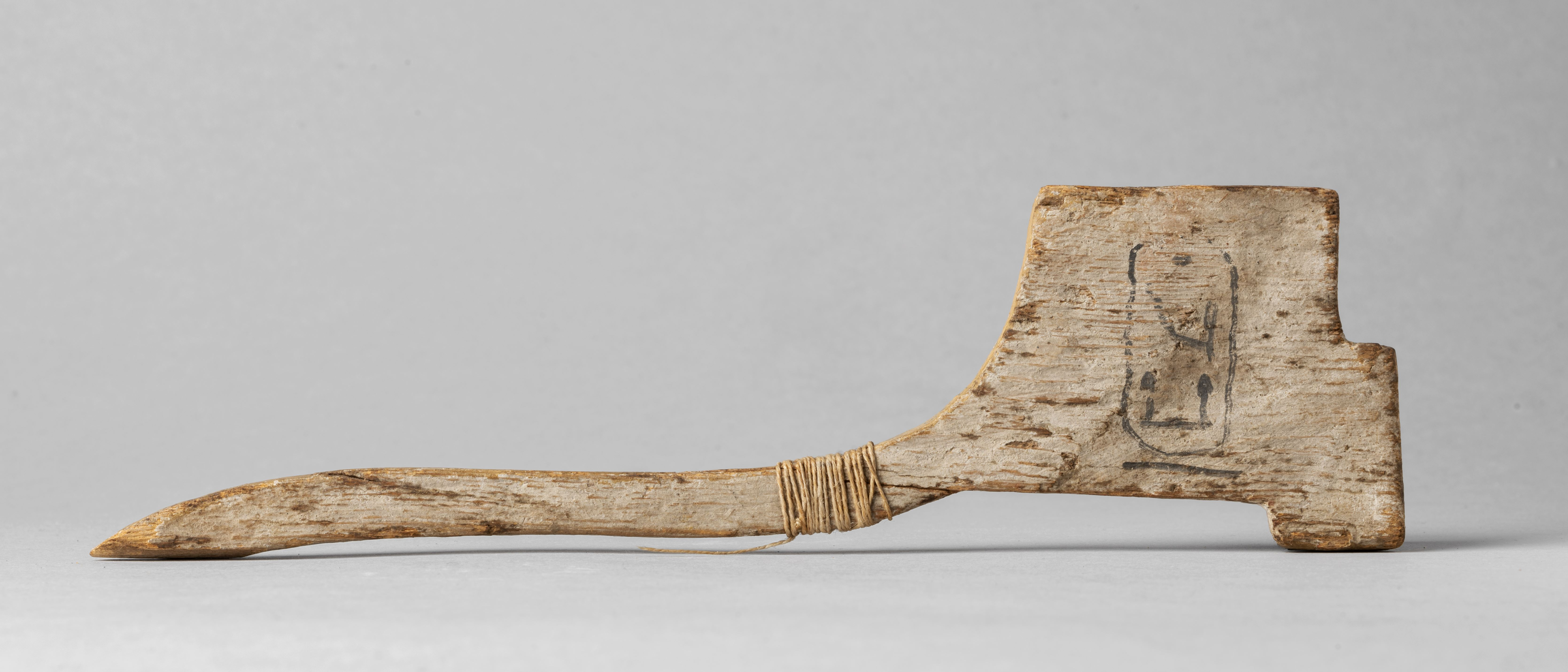
Ritual adze with the cartouches of Ahmose-Nefertari and Amenhotep I on them, possibly used in their individual opening of the mouth rituals by Thutmose I.

The actions of the ceremony can vary slightly depending on the time period and who it was being done to. There is evidence of 75 acts that must be done during the ceremony. The most notable being from the tomb of Rekhmire.

=== Rekhmire version ===
The Rekhmire version of the ceremony is slightly different than how it is depicted in other texts, as a statue was used instead of the body. The texts put an emphasis on the making of the statue in episodes 2-18. Once complete, in episodes 23-25, priests would sacrifice a bull and offer certain parts of it to the statue. They would then begin touching areas of the statue such as the eyes and mouth with instruments like the ceremonial adze, and present the tools including the peseshkef to it from episodes 26-41. Finally they would anoint and robe the statue on episode 50, and bring it offerings in episodes 59 and 65.

- Episodes 1–9 Preliminary rites
- Episodes 10–22 Animation of the statue
- Episodes 23–42 Meat offerings aligned with upper Egypt
- Episodes 43–46 Meat offerings aligned with lower Egypt
- Episodes 47–71 Funerary meal
- Episodes 72–75 Closing rites

=== General ceremony process ===
- Purifying the body was an important step before the ceremony could take place. This was done using natron, a type of salt used to preserve the body in the mummification process. Afterwards perfumes and oils were placed in their mouth and on other regions of their body. This was believed to have symbolized Horus's saliva, a god associated with resurrection or rebirth. During this task, one priest would wear a jackal mask to represent the god Anubis. They would be in charge of keeping the corpse upright through the process.
- Preceding the ritual, a procession takes place in which a Sem priest - an elderly man of esteemed religious rank responsible for embalming and mummifying the body - ceremonially faints at the tomb's entrance and is subsequently revived by fellow priests. Following this, the son of the individual and/or Sem priest declares "I have witnessed my father in all his forms." In this scenario, the deceased individual is regarded as Osiris while the Sem priest represents Horus. Analogous to the mythical tale in which Horus protects his father, the Sem priest safeguards the body. This is well described in the pyramid texts of Unas that states: “Osiris’s Uni's. accept Horus’s eye, which you should embrace.” This was a symbol of being rejuvenated as Horus’ eye was eventually restored after being taken from the god Set in mythology. The Sem priest would then change clothes before entering the tomb to establish moving on to a new phase of the ceremony.
- Following this, the central part of the ritual commences, during which the Sem priest utilizes specialized tools such as the adze and peseshkef to touch the deceased's eyes and mouth. These actions are regarded as symbolically reviving the senses required for their journey into the afterlife. Moreover, the Sem priest recites prayers and spells during these procedures to ensure the full restoration of these functions.
- Finally, the Sem priest would offer gifts such as grain, then wrapped them in linen and had spells recited to them. The people who knew the deceased would have a funerary meal to finish the ceremony.

== The ceremony in literature ==
The Book of the Dead also contains a spell for this process, which the deceased may use on themselves:

My mouth is opened by Ptah,
My mouth's bonds are loosed by my city-god.
Thoth has come fully equipped with spells,
He looses the bonds of Set/Seth from my mouth.
Atum has given me my hands,
They are placed as guardians.

My mouth is given to me,
My mouth is opened by Ptah,
With that chisel of metal
With which he opened the mouth of the gods.
I am Sekhmet-Wadjet who dwells in the west of heaven,
I am Sahyt among the souls of On.

Translating literally as "opening of the mouth," the Egyptian terms for the ritual are wpt-r and um-r. According to Ann Macy Roth, the verb wpi connotes an opening that splits, divides or separates: "it can be used, for example, to describe the separation of two combatants, the dividing of time, or even an analysis or determination of the truth."

Pyramid texts of Unas/Unis utterance 34:

"smjn, smjn, open your mouth, O Unas!

Natron of the South, 5 pellets of El Kab.

You taste its taste in front of the divine chapels,

that which Horus spits out, smjn,

that which Seth spits out, smjn,

the two Harmonious Ones, smjn.

To say four times:

You purify yourself with natron, together with the Followers of Horus."

Utterance 93:

"Wash yourself, Unas, open your mouth with the Eye of Horus!

Call your Ka, like Osiris, that he may protect you against every kind of wrath of the dead!

Unas, receive this your bread which is the Eye of Horus!"

Tomb of Petosiris:

The perfume, the perfume opens thy mouth.

It is the saliva of Horus, the perfume.

It is the saliva of ... , the perfume.

It is which strengthens the heart of the two lords, the perfume.

== The ceremony in music ==
The 13th track on Geogaddi by electronic duo band Boards of Canada, titled Opening The Mouth, is a direct reference to the ritual. The track is slightly over one minute long, composed of a gasping, whaling-like breathing noise loop over a distant reeving vehicle engine heard throughout. The breath noises are also associated with the word “us” by many fans, which further supports connection to the ceremony. The rituals thematics of revoking deceased spirits aligns with the track’s ominous production.

== Connections with Psalm 51 ==
Parallels between the Opening of the Mouth and Psalm 51 have been noted. The parallels include:

- Mentions of ritual washing with special herbs (Psalm 51:2,7).
- Restoration of broken bones (verse 8).
- "O Lord, open thou my lips" (verse 15).
- Sacrifices (verses 16, 17, and 19).

== See also ==
- Ancient Egyptian funerary practices
