= Rope stretcher =

Ancient egyptian surveyor

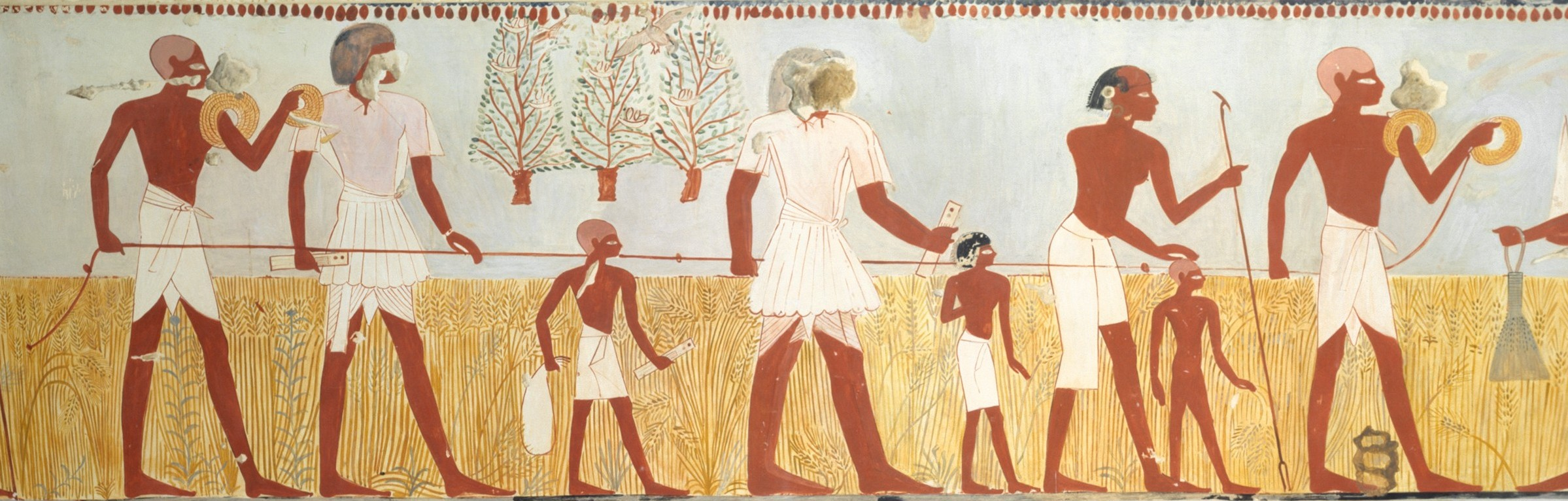
A rope being used to measure fields. Taken from the Tomb of Menna, TT69.

In ancient Egypt, a rope stretcher (or harpedonaptai) was a surveyor who measured real property demarcations and foundations using knotted cords, stretched so the rope did not sag. The practice is depicted in tomb paintings of the Theban Necropolis. Rope stretchers used 3-4-5 triangles and the plummet, which are still in use by modern surveyors.

The commissioning of a new sacred building was a solemn occasion in which pharaohs and other high-ranking officials personally stretched ropes to define the foundation. This important ceremony, and therefore rope-stretching itself, are attested over 3000 years from the early dynastic period to the Ptolemaic kingdom.

Rope stretching technology spread to ancient Greece and India, where it stimulated the development of geometry and mathematics.

== See also ==
- Gromatici
- Surveying
- Trigonometry
