= Persian Room =

Persian Room may refer to:

- A section of the Gayer-Anderson Museum

Las Vegas music venues:

- Plaza Hotel (1934−1978)
- Dunes (1961−1971)
