= Gayer-Anderson cat =

Ancient Egyptian statue of a cat

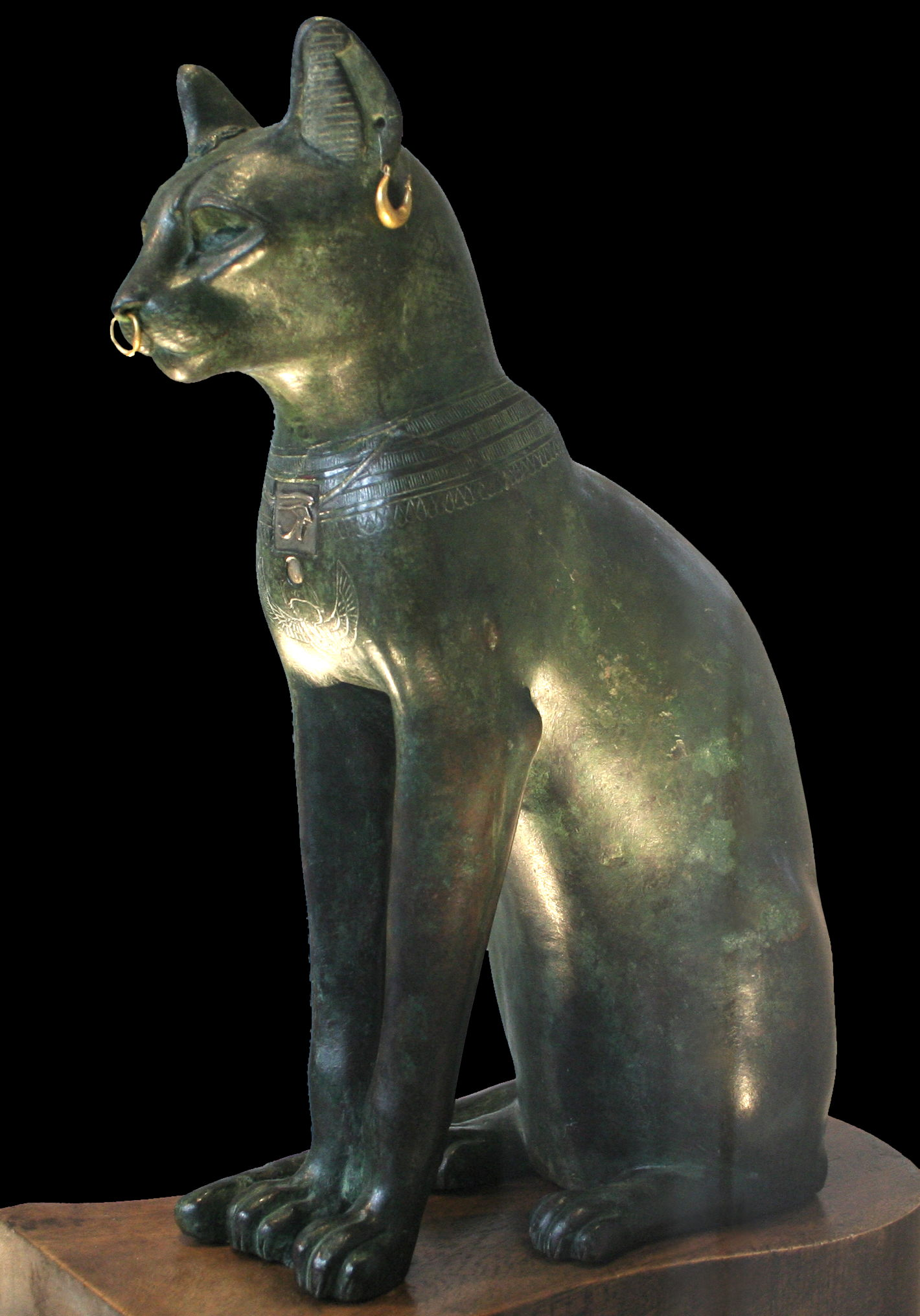
- The Gayer-Anderson cat on display in the British Museum
- Material: Bronze with gold ornaments
- Size: 42 cm high
- Created: Late Period, 664–332 BC
- Discovered: Saqqara, Egypt
- Present location: British Museum, London
- Registration: EA 64391
- 3D model

The Gayer-Anderson cat is an ancient Egyptian statue of a cat, which dates from the Late Period (around 664–332 BC). It is made of bronze, with gold ornaments.

== Style and detail ==
The sculpture is known as the Gayer-Anderson cat after major Robert Grenville Gayer-Anderson who, together with Mary Stout Shaw, donated it to the British Museum. The statue is a representation of the female cat deity Bastet. The cat wears jewellery and a protective Wadjet amulet. The earrings and nose ring on the statue may not have always belonged to the cat. A scarab appears on the head and a winged scarab is shown on the chest. The statue is 42 cm (17 in) high and 13 cm (5.1 in) wide. A copy of the statue is in the Gayer-Anderson Museum, located in Cairo.

== Construction ==
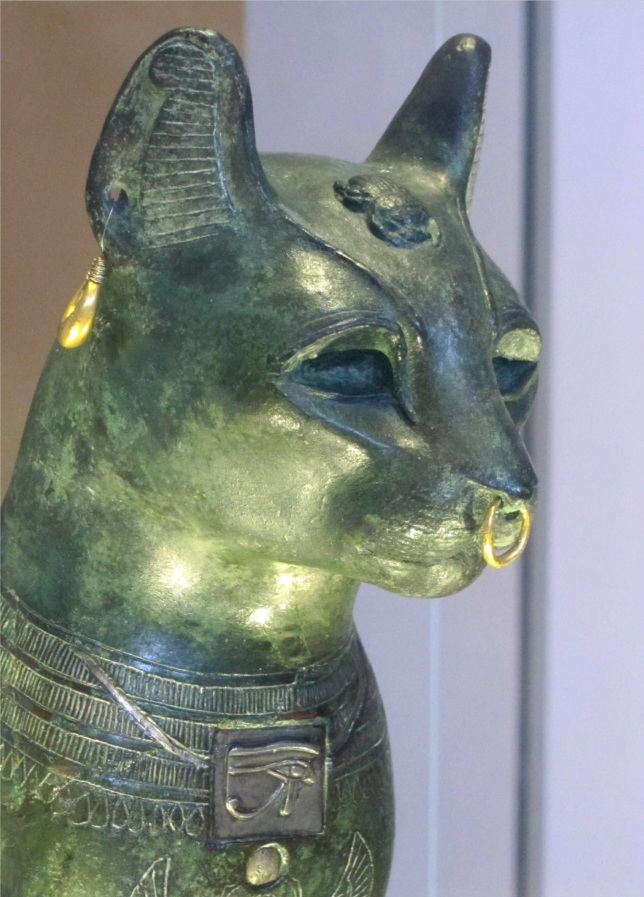
Detail of the head

The statue is not as well preserved as it appears. X-rays taken of the sculpture reveal that there are cracks that extend almost completely around the centre of the cat's body, and only an internal system of strengthening prevents the cat's head from falling off. The repairs to the cat were carried out by Gayer-Anderson, who was a keen restorer of antiquities in the 1930s. When he bought it, the surface of the cat was "covered with a heavy coating of crystalline verdigris and crisp flakes of red patina" which he carefully chipped away.

The cat was manufactured by the lost-wax casting method, where a wax model is covered with clay and fired in a kiln until the wax flows out, and the hollow mould is refilled with molten metal. In this case the metal was 85% copper, 13% tin, 2% arsenic with a 0.2% trace of lead. The remains of the pins that held the wax core can still be seen using X-rays. The original metalworkers would have been able to create a range of colours on a bronze casting and the stripes on the tail are due to metal of a differing composition. It is also considered likely that the eyes contained stone or glass decorations.
