= Robert Grenville Gayer-Anderson =

Surgeon, soldier, administrator and collector (1881–1945)

Robert Grenville Gayer-Anderson (29 July 1881 – June 1945), known as John to his friends, was an Irish surgeon, soldier, colonial administrator and collector, perhaps best known for his connection with Egypt and Egyptian antiquities. The Gayer-Anderson Museum in Cairo, and the Gayer-Anderson cat, an Ancient Egyptian bronze figurine of the goddess Bastet in the form of a cat, now in the collections of the British Museum, are both named after him.

== Early life ==
Gayer-Anderson was born, an identical twin with his brother Thomas, on 29 July 1881 at Listowel, County Kerry, Ireland. Their mother, Mary (née Gayer), was of Welsh descent and their father, Henry (1849-1927) was of Scottish descent. The twins were the youngest of the four children born to Mary and Henry and the family moved to Tonbridge in 1894 specifically so that the children could attend Tonbridge School as day-boys.

Gayer-Anderson began studying medicine at Guy's Hospital in London in 1898, when he was 17. After five years' study, he qualified as a Member of the Royal College of Surgeons and Licentiate of the Royal College of Physicians in 1903. He was then appointed assistant house surgeon to William Arbuthnot Lane, but desiring a more adventurous life, he followed his twin brother into the British Army, receiving his commission in the Royal Army Medical Corps in 1904.

== Egypt ==
In 1907 Gayer-Anderson was seconded into the Egyptian Army as a major (Egypt had been under British colonial rule since 1882). He practised as a surgeon in Abbassia. Gayer-Anderson was entranced by Egypt, learning Arabic and collecting objects from antique dealers. After two years of service, Gayer-Anderson returned to England on leave, but realised he was no longer interested in either England or medicine. He returned to Egypt in 1909 as an inspector for recruiting for the Egyptian Army. This allowed him to travel widely across the country, and he collected antiquities on his travels, becoming more and more knowledgeable on the subject.

Gayer-Anderson served in Egypt and the Gallipoli campaign during World War I (1914–1918). He was later appointed Senior Inspector in the Ministry of Interior, and then Oriental Secretary to the High Commissioner. Following Egyptian independence in 1922, Gayer-Anderson accompanied King Fuad on a tour of the provinces. He was also one of the official party invited to the opening of the Tomb of Tutankhamun. He retired from the Egyptian government in 1923, at the age of 42. He intended to study antiquities, and write articles and poetry.

One of the most famous objects associated with him is the Gayer-Anderson cat, a bronze figurine depicting the goddess Bastet in the form of a cat. It dates from 600 BC and was probably made for a temple. Gayer-Anderson bought the figurine in October 1934 and donated it to the British Museum in 1939, and it is one of the most popular exhibits there. He also bequeathed parts of his collections to the Fitzwilliam Museum in Cambridge.

In 1924 Gayer-Anderson bought the late 14th-century medieval hall house Little Hall in Lavenham, Suffolk, England, and when his health began to fail in the mid-1930s, he considered moving there, and so sent many of his possessions on to Suffolk. His brother Thomas was already living at the Hall, having moved there in 1929.

In February 1935 he visited the 16th-century Mamluk Beit al-Kretilya ("the House of the Cretan Woman"), two domestic buildings in Cairo that were undergoing restoration, and managed to secure a lifetime lease for them. He continued the restoration work, and furnished the rooms with his antiquities. In 1942 he returned to Lavenham to live there permanently, and gifted his lifetime lease of the house and its contents to the Egyptian nation. The house was then known as the Gayer-Anderson Pasha Museum of Oriental Arts and Crafts, following Gayer-Anderson's elevation to the title of Pasha by King Farouk in 1943. It is now known as the Gayer-Anderson Museum.

== Personal life ==
Their father was abusive and in 1917 Gayer-Anderson and his twin Thomas changed their surname by deed poll from Anderson to Gayer-Anderson. Their two siblings were always known just as Anderson. Gayer-Anderson married and fathered a child but although Gayer-Anderson spent much of his life in Egypt, his wife and son, John, remained in Lavenham, together with his wife’s other children from an earlier relationship.

Gayer-Anderson died of a heart attack in June 1945. His ashes were buried in a 2nd-century Greek urn at St Peter and St Paul's Church, Lavenham. The Little Hall Museum in Lavenham displays some of the Gayer-Anderson brothers' collection.

== Works (incomplete list) ==
- R.G. Gayer-Anderson, 1948. Christeros and other poems, Shrewsbury.
- Sulaiman al-Kretli, 1951. Legends of the Bait al-Kretliya as told by Sheikh Sulaiman al-Kretli, transl. R.G. 'John' Gayer Anderson, Ipswich.

== Gallery ==
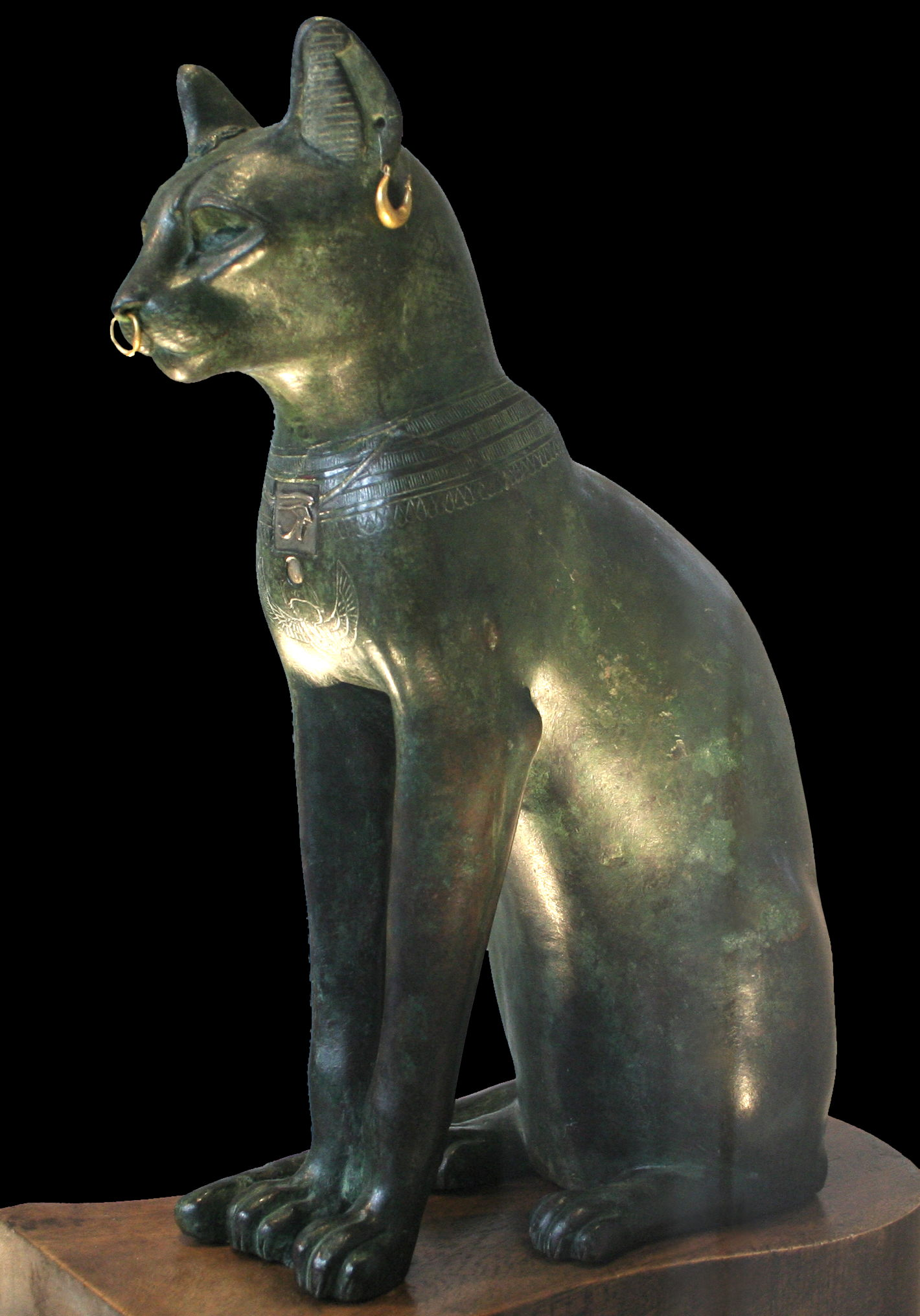
The Gayer-Anderson cat at the British Museum.

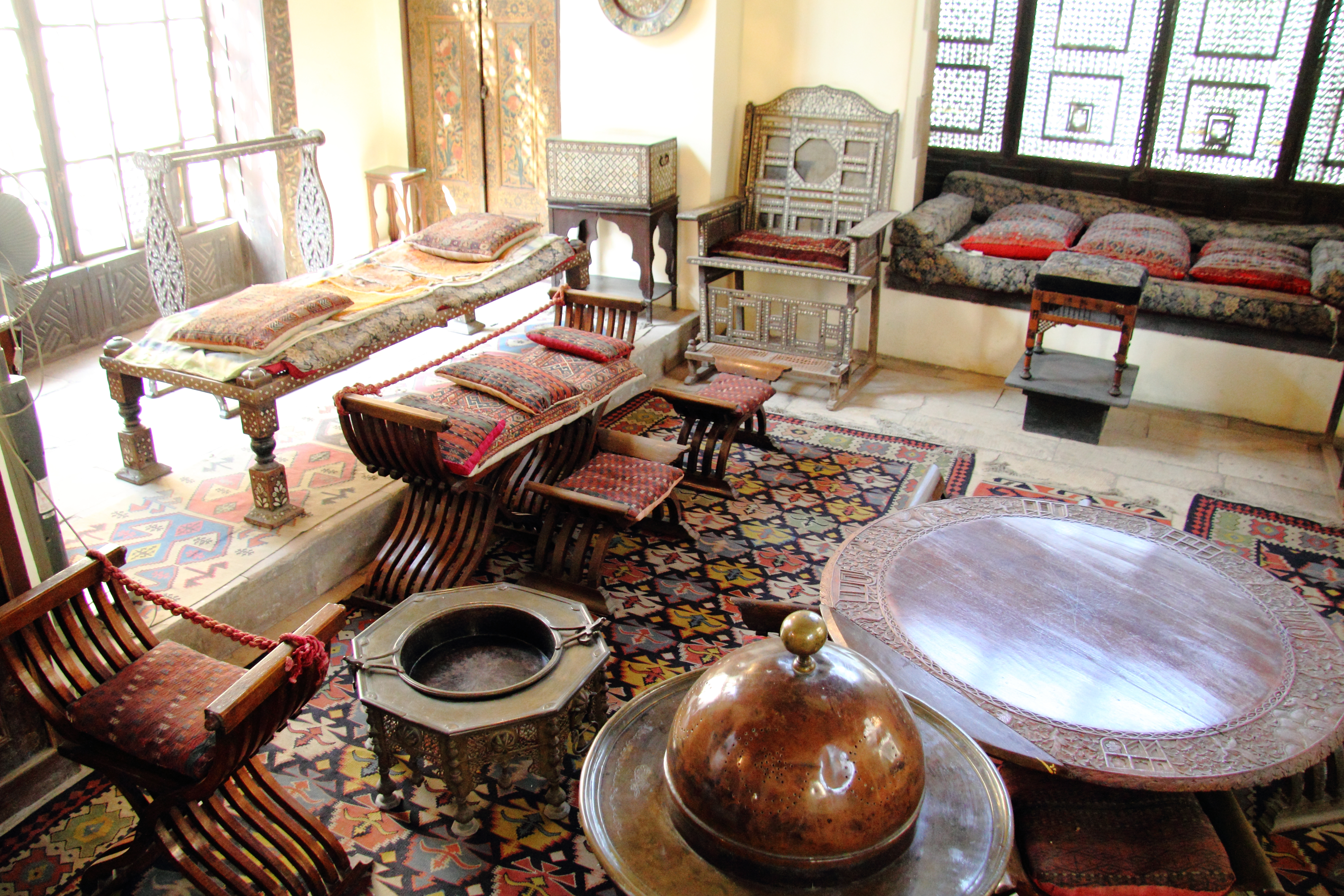
Interior of one of the rooms at the Gayer-Anderson Museum in Cairo.

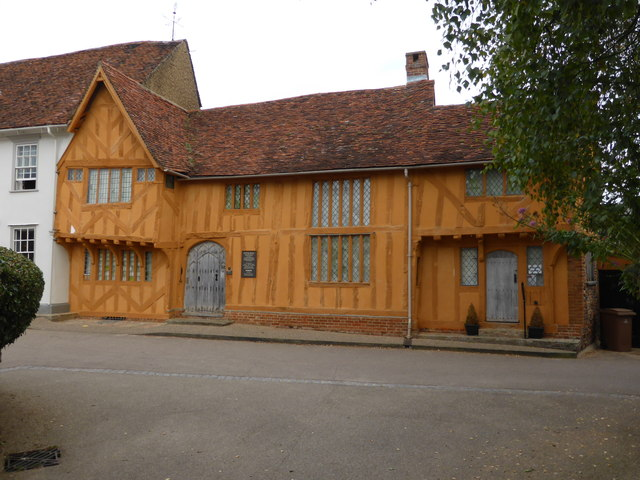
Little Hall, Lavenham, Suffolk.
