= Gayer-Anderson Museum =

Coordinates: 30.0284°N 31.2507°E

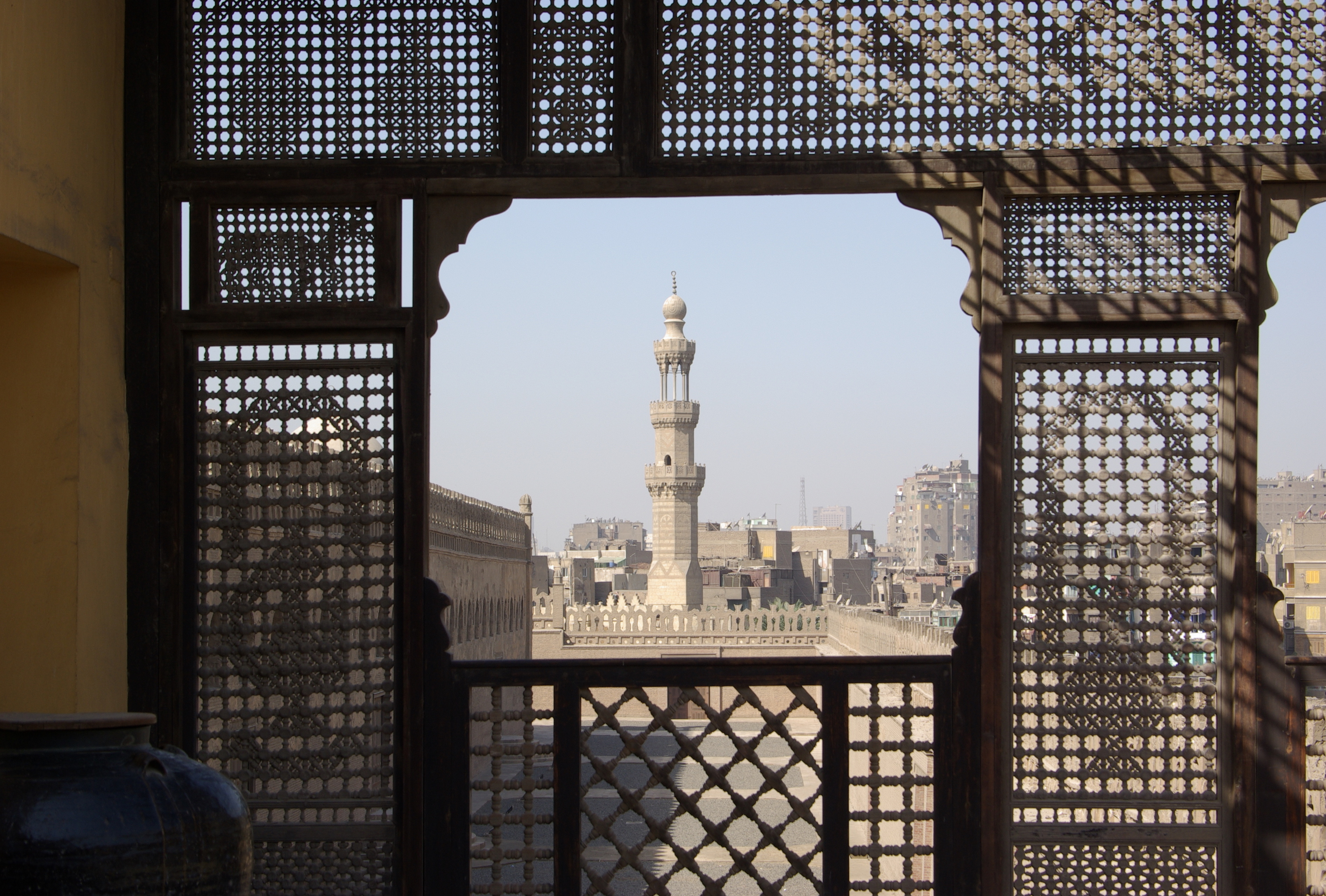
- The Egyptian roof terrace of the Gayer-Anderson Museum
- Location: Cairo, Egypt
- Type: art museum

The Gayer-Anderson Museum (Arabic: متحف جاير أندرسون) is an art museum located in Cairo, Egypt. It is situated adjacent to the Mosque of Ahmad ibn Tulun in the Sayyida Zeinab neighborhood. The building takes its name from Major Robert Grenville Gayer-Anderson Pasha, who resided in the house between 1935 and 1942 with special permission from the Egyptian Government. The museum is noted for being one of examples of 17th-century domestic architecture left in Cairo, and also for its collection of furniture, carpets, curio, and other objects.

== Gayer-Anderson Pasha ==
Robert Grenville Gayer-Anderson joined the Royal Army Medical Corps in 1904 and was later transferred to the Egyptian Army in 1907. He was then promoted to become a Major in 1914 and during the same year, he became Assistant Adjutant-General for recruiting in the Egyptian Army. In 1919, he retired from the army to become the Senior Inspector in the Egyptian Ministry of the Interior, and he later became the Oriental Secretary to the British Residency in Cairo. He retired in 1924 but continued to live in Egypt, expanding his interests in Egyptology and Oriental Studies.

== History ==
Bayt al-Kritliyya is considered to be one of the remarkable examples of Muslim domestic architecture in Cairo. It dates back to the Mamluk Period (1040 AH/1631 AD) and it was built by Hagg Mohamed Salem Galmam el- Gazzar. The museum consists of two houses built using the outer wall of the Mosque of Ibn Tulun as support. The larger house, located to the east (the outermost side in relation to the mosque) was built in 1632 AD (1041 AH) by Hajj Mohammad ibn al-Hajj Salem ibn Galman al-Gazzar. It later came into the possession of a wealthy Muslim woman from Crete, and the home became popularly known as "Bayt al-Kritliyya" (Arabic: بيت الكريتلية), or "House of the Cretan Woman." The second house, to the west (the innermost side in relation to the mosque) was built in 1540 AD (947 AH) by Abdel-Qader al-Haddad. It later became known as "Bayt Amna bint Salim" (Arabic: بيت آمنة بنت سالم), after its last owner. The two houses were joined by a bridge at the third floor level at an unknown point, and are both collectively known as Bayt al-Kritliyya.

The construction of private homes against the outer wall of a mosque was common practice. In 1928 the Egyptian government began to clear the homes, many of which were in very poor condition, away from the mosque as part of a plan to make important Islamic monuments more accessible. The Committee for the Conservation of Arab Monuments objected to the demolition of Bayt al-Kritliyya, however, on the grounds that the home was well preserved. The home was kept intact, and repairs were made to the side walls to strengthen them after the neighboring houses were torn down.

In 1935, Major Gayer-Anderson, a retired collector and self-described Orientalist, was granted permission to reside in the house, which had just been restored. Gayer-Anderson oversaw the installation of electricity and plumbing, and the restoration of fountains, pavements, and other parts of the interior of the home. He populated the building with his personal collection of art, furnishings, and carpets, and he built a sailing boat he used to collect these antiques from all over Egypt, it was docked on the Nile not far from the house. In 1942, Gayer-Anderson was forced by ill health to leave Egypt, and he gave the contents of the house to the Egyptian government. King Farouk gave him the title of Pasha in return. Gayer-Anderson died in England in 1945, and is buried in Lavenham, Suffolk.

The James Bond film The Spy Who Loved Me was partially shot in the museum, in the ceremonial reception hall and the rooftop terrace.

== Apartments ==
=== Subdivisions of a Mohamedan House (Haramlik and Salamlik) ===
The house is divided into two halves, the Haramlik, or the family residence, and the Salamlik, also known as the guest-house.

The house has five main entrances; one for ladies, a sebil, an entrance through the garden and two doors of honour.

=== The Haramlik ===
Only the master and other family members such as the wives and children had access to this side of the house. Also, close friends were allowed.

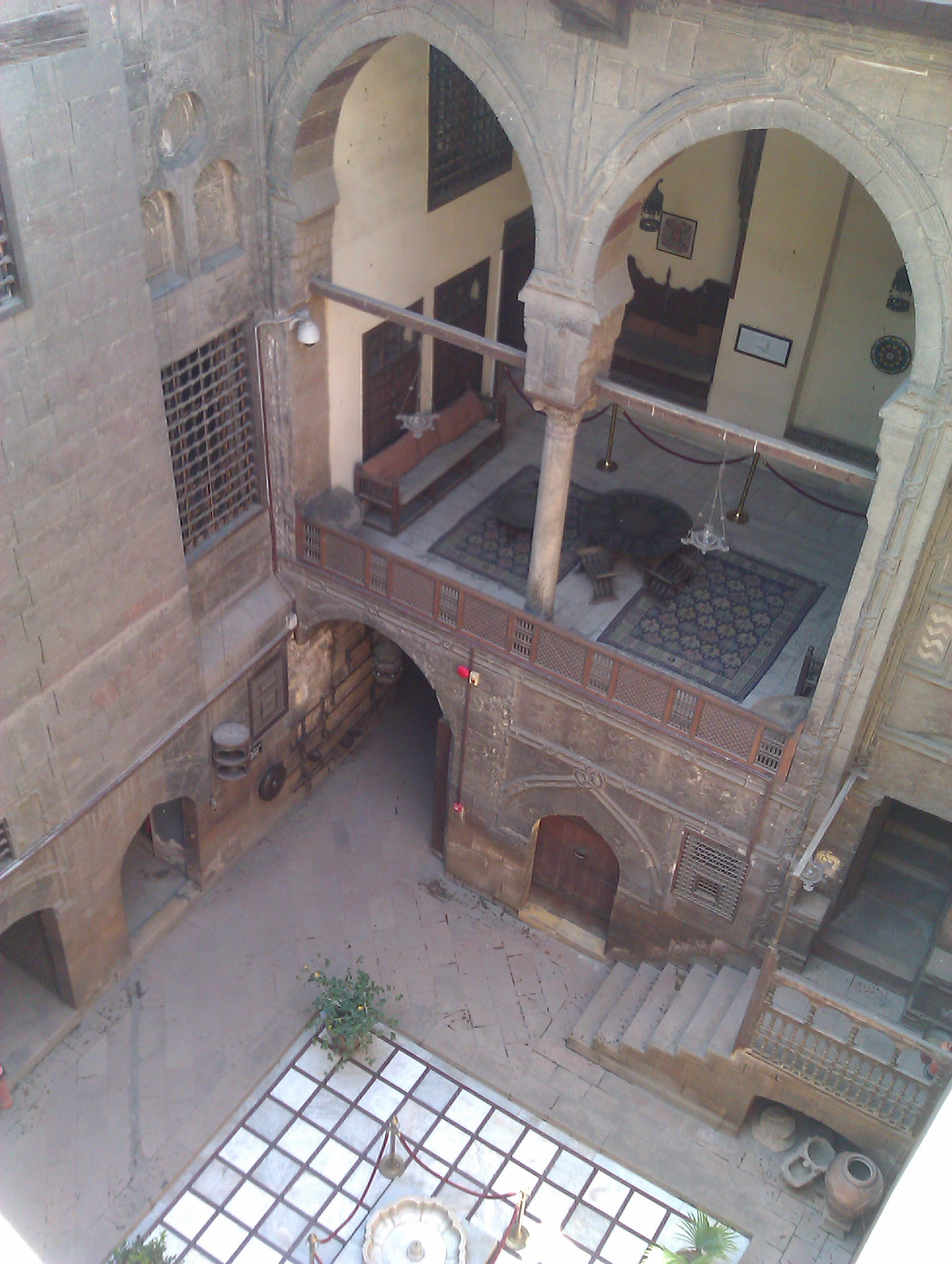
The Courtyard

=== The Courtyard ===
The courtyard's floor is made of marble and the windows of the Haramlik open onto it. A stairway leading to the Haramlik is also present in the courtyard. Other remarkable objects include the Bats’ Well, also known as Bier el- watawit and is about fifteen meters deep.

=== The Maq’ad or Loggia ===
The Maq’ad is a reception room, which in this case, is open air. There are brass bowls dating back to some time between the fourteenth and seventeenth century. Another common feature in Mamluk-era houses was the “Durkah”, a pathway from a door to another. It is where guests would put their shoes before reaching a divan.

=== Qa’a or Reception Room ===
This is the main apartment in the Haramlik. Marble tables are present. Fruits, flowers and drinks were also part of the tradition of this room. Also, there is a part of the “holy carpet”, also known as Kiswa, in green silk, and it was a gift given by Lewa Yehia Pasha.

=== Service Room ===
This room is well known for its dresses and cupboards; which were designed by Anderson Pasha and were modeled after Turkish examples.

=== The Khazna or Safe-Room ===
The Khazna was placed between the men's and women's apartments and it was where coffee was being made. Nowadays, it is used to display miniature Persian paintings.

=== The Harem ===
This is a very large room and is supported by four columns. Also, there are windows on all four sides of the room.

There are some Persian cupboards from a palace in Teheran and each cupboard holds a different collection.

=== A Secret Chamber or Makhba ===
It is placed above the magic well and was used as a hiding place for people or objects, if they were breaking the law or trying to escape.

=== The Main Stairs ===
Stairways were not a familiar feature in Islamic architecture. In fact, they were only used in houses. On the main stair walls, a series of Persian Kashan, also known as velvet prayer-hangings, are hung.

=== Reading and Writing Rooms ===
The Reading room was quite small and had a window-seat. It has shelves, inspired by Islamic designs. The walls are decorated with Chinese Flower paintings on rice paper.

The Writing Room now serves as an office for the museum’s curator but it also serves as a study room. It could be used by people looking for travel books specifically. For that reason, the room is furnished with long tables and benches. Also, the walls have pictures and ancient examples of Egyptian drawings and writings.

=== The Roof Garden ===
Bayt al-Kritliyya’s flat roof has been turned into a roof garden, and is enclosed with mashrabias. These designs are of Coptic origin and they reflect Christian symbols such as the cross. This is considered to be quite rare since the only other examples of Christian mashrabias are found in the Coptic Museum, as well as in some ancient houses in Old Cairo.

=== The Persian Room ===
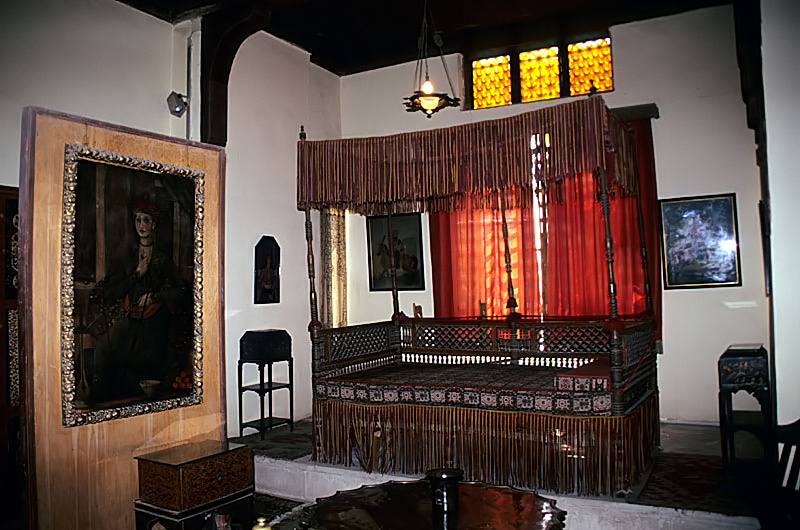
Persian Room

The objects present in this room are from the later Persian or Shah Abbas period, except for the bed, which originates from Egypt, and a replica of an Egyptian couch with bulls feet.

=== The Byzantine or Bridge Room ===
This is a bridge which links the Haramlik to the Salamlik. However, it is nowadays used to portray the few Christian objects present in the house.

=== The Ancient Egyptian Room ===
Originally, this was Gayer Anderson Pasha’s study room and it still contains some Ancient Egyptian objects. Some of the objects worth noticing include Egypt’s map, engraved on an ostrich egg, a black and gold mummy case, dating back to the eighteenth century BC and a bronze Ancient Egyptian cat, with gold earrings.

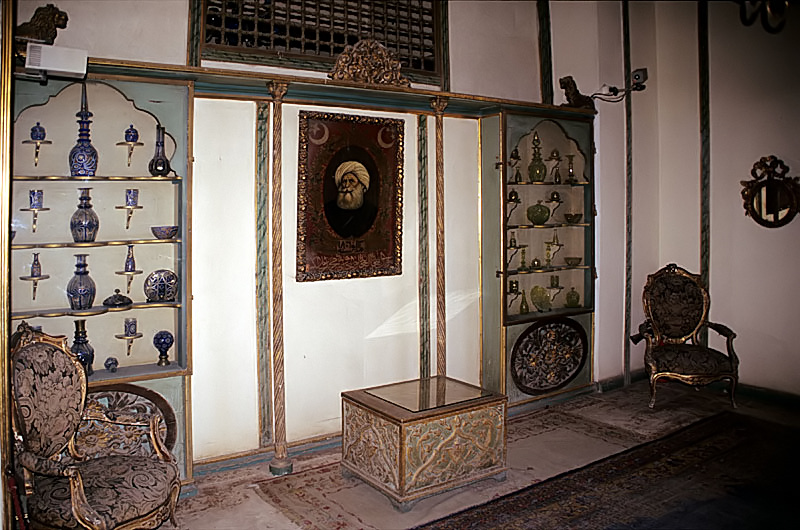
Mohamed Ali Room

=== The Mohamed Ali Room ===
This is an Ottoman apartment with green and gold decorated walls. All objects and furniture present in the room are from the Rococo period. A piece of furniture worth noting would be the throne chair, which dates back to one of the earlier Khedives, maybe Ismail Pasha. Also, two portraits and a mechanical singing bird in a cage are present in this room. The singing bird is a Harem toy from Istanbul, and was brought by the founder’s brother.

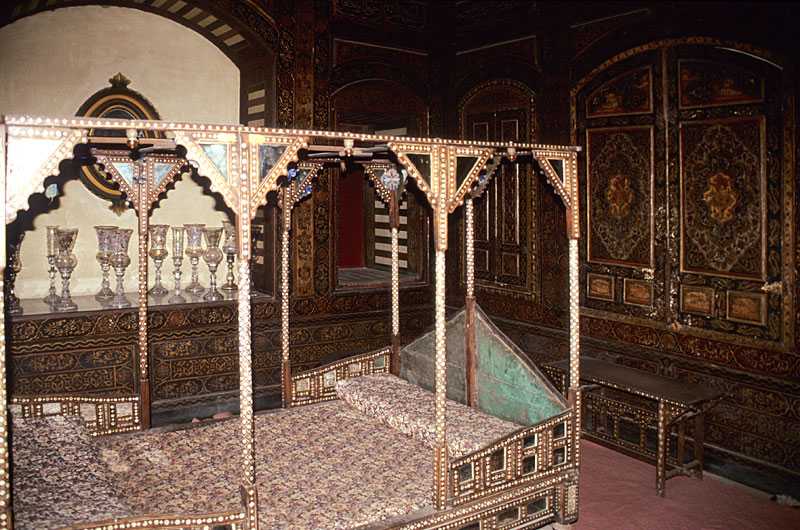
Damascus Room

=== The Damascus Room ===
This late seventeenth century room was built by the Committee for the Preservation of Arab Monuments in 1937 and was brought from Damascus by Gayer- Anderson Pasha. The whole room is made of wood, reflecting great beauty and charm. On three sides of the room are three windows (edit), while on the fourth, is the cupboard doors. The ceiling is also worthy of notice as it is inscribed with a poem, which is praising the Prophet. Other remarkable objects in this room include a collection of different colored and designed candlesticks, spread around the room.

== Legends of the house ==
A number of legends are associated with the Bayt al-Kritliyya, and the sailing Boat(dahabeya)named La Marée, which were collected by Gayer-Anderson and, published as Legends of the House of the Cretan Woman (see sources).

Among the legends are:

- The house was built on the remnants of an ancient mountain called Gebel Yashkur, the "Hill of Thanksgiving." It is believed that this is where Noah's Ark came to rest after the Deluge described in both the Bible and Qur'an, and that the last of the floodwater was drained through the well in the courtyard of the house; this legend inspired him to build a sailing boat on the Nile in front of the house in old Cairo to which he gave a French name ( La Marée ) meaning "the tide"
- Moses was spoken to by God on this spot;
- The house and the Dahabeya ( La Marée )" his own sailing Boat on the Nile " were protected by a shaykh, Haroun al-Husseini, who is buried under one of the corners of the house.

He is said to have blinded three men who attempted to rob the house, who stumbled around the house for three days and nights until they were finally caught;

- The well in the house is said to possess miraculous qualities - for example, a lover gazing into the water would see the face of his or her sweetheart instead of his/her own reflection.

== Visitor information ==
The museum is run by the Supreme Council of Antiquities.

The Gayer-Anderson Museum is located adjacent to the Mosque of Ibn Tulun off of 'Abd al-Magid al-Labban (Al-Salbiyya) Street in Sayyida Zeinab, Cairo. It is most conveniently reached by taxi. The nearest station on the Cairo Metro, the Sayyida Zeinab station, is approximately 1 km to the west.

As of January 2020, entrance fees were E£60 for foreign adults, E£30 for foreign students, and E£10 for Egyptian nationals. A camera ticket costs an additional E£50.

== Gallery ==
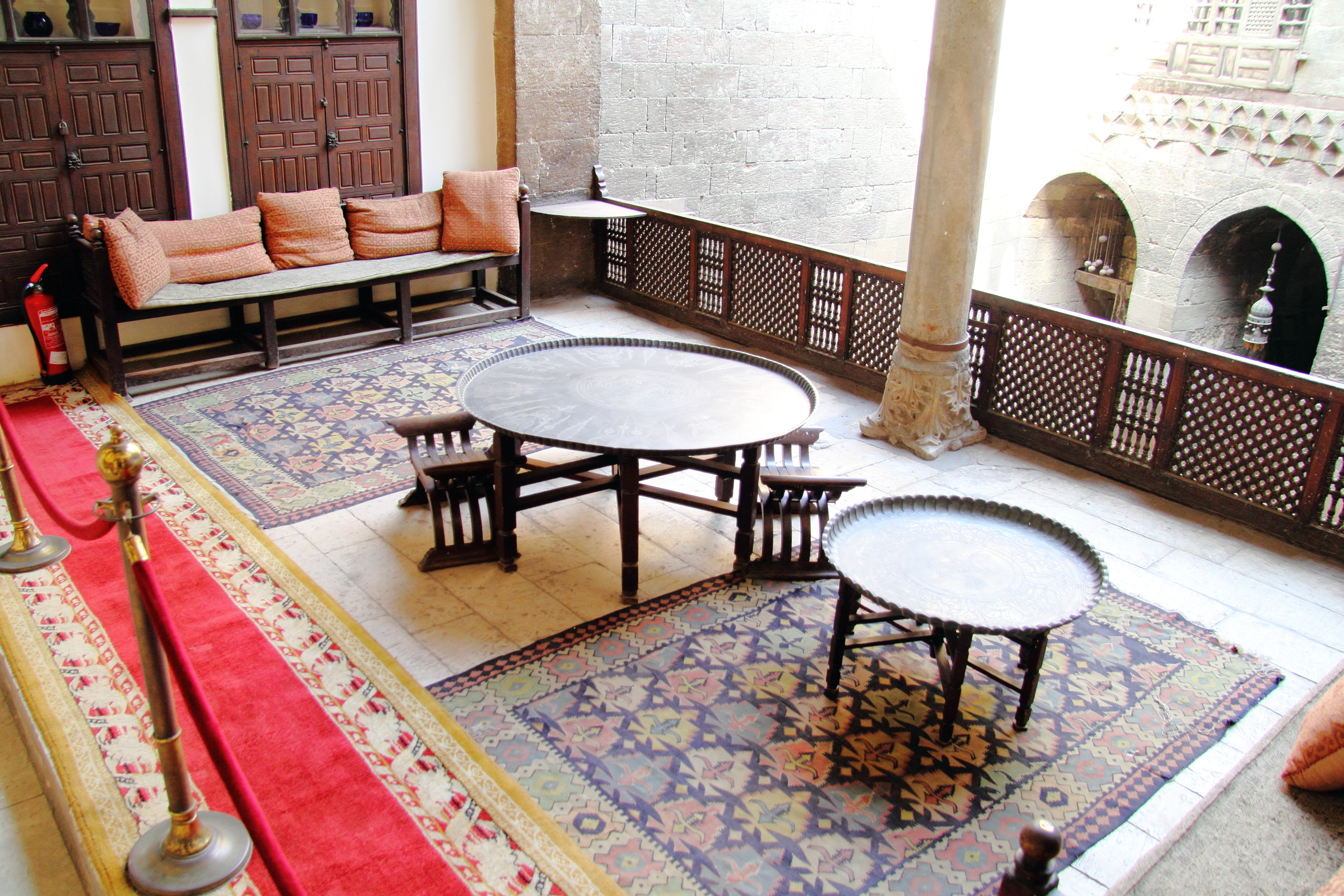

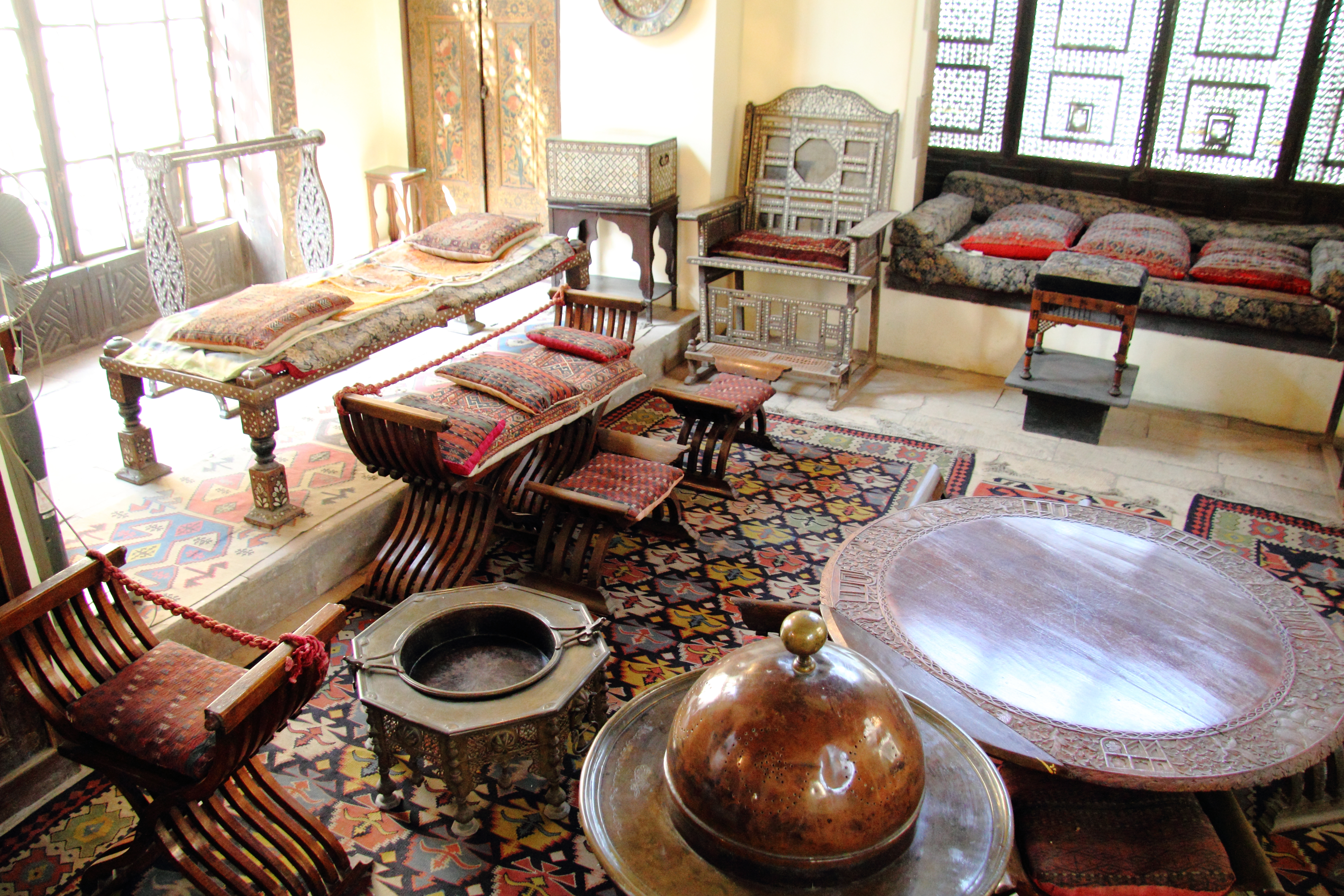

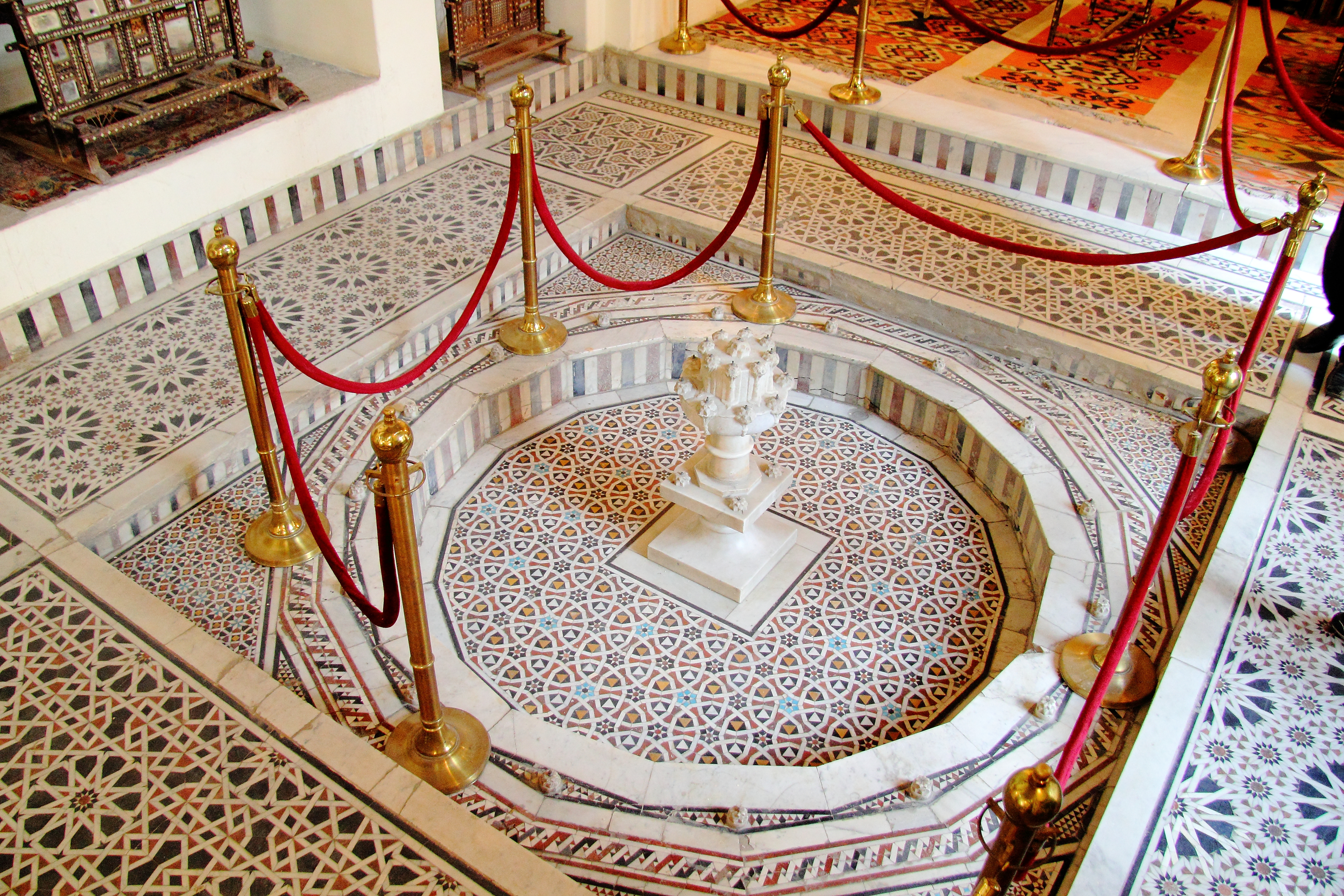

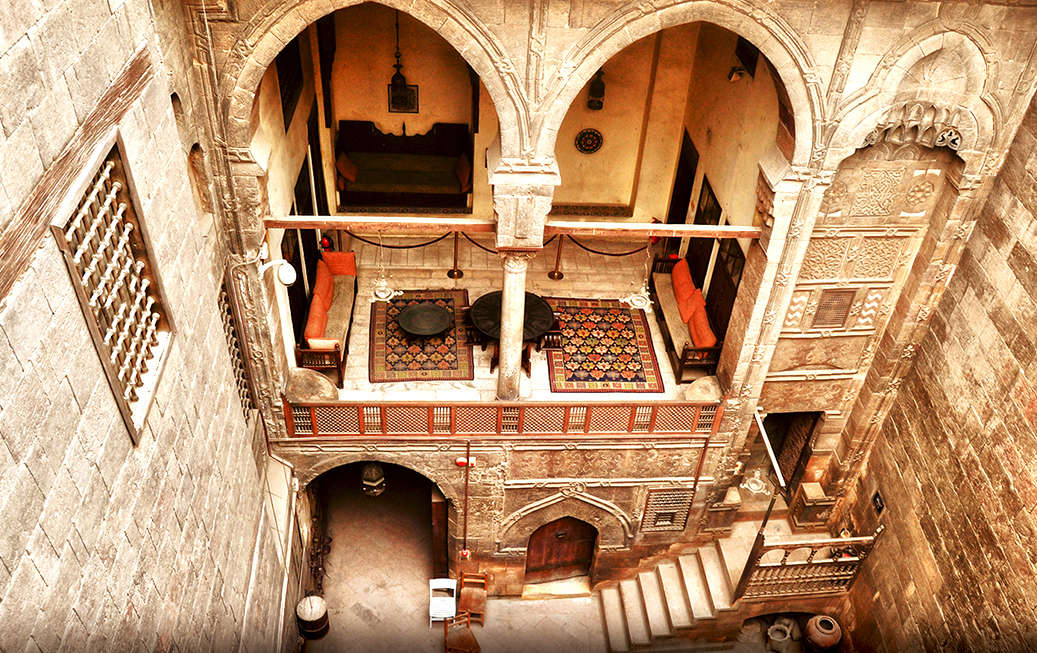

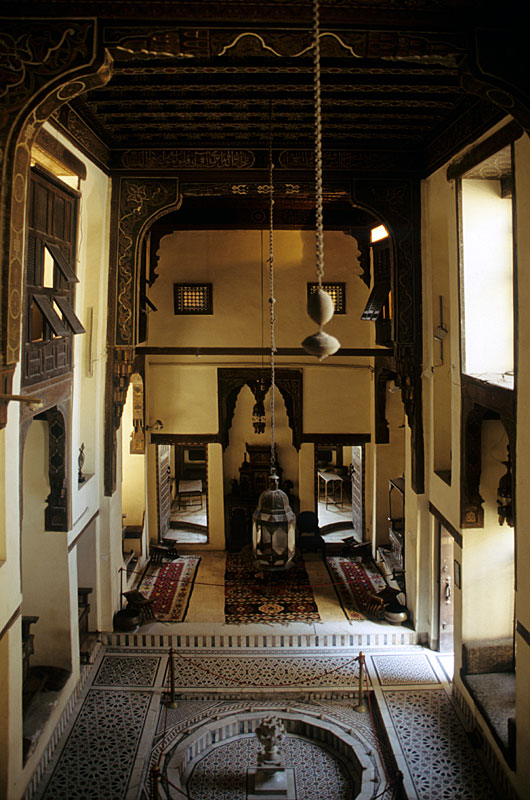

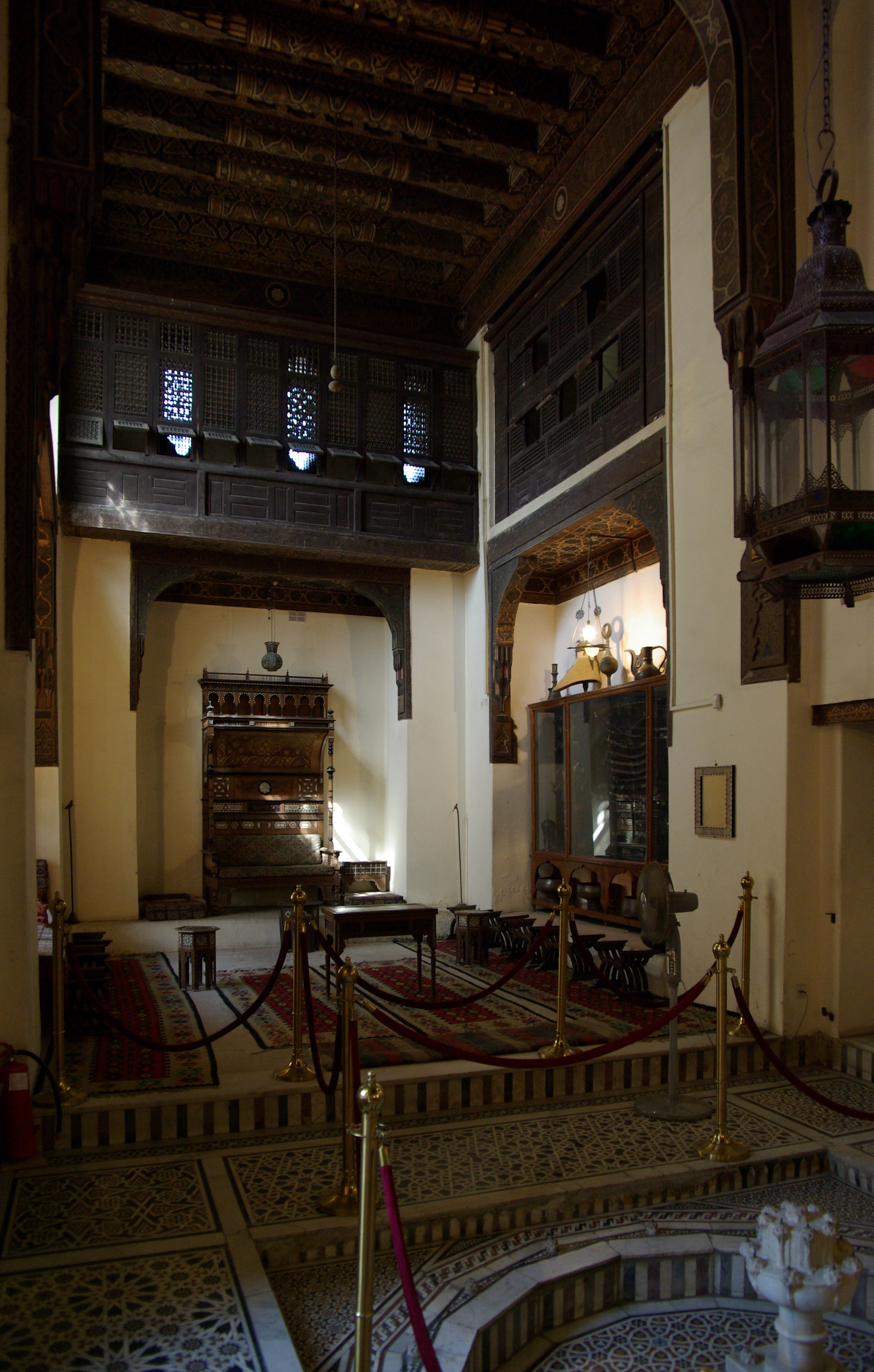

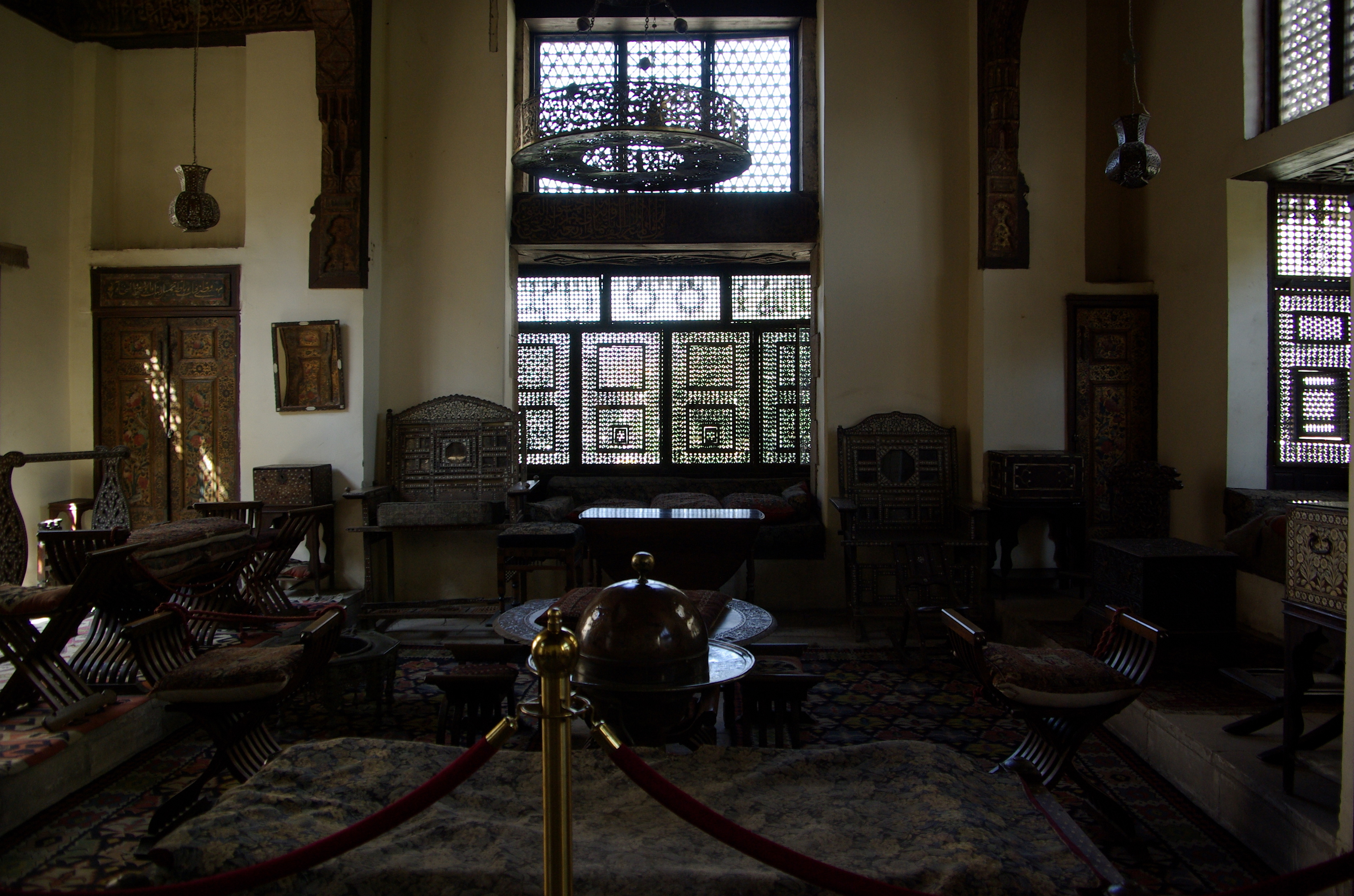

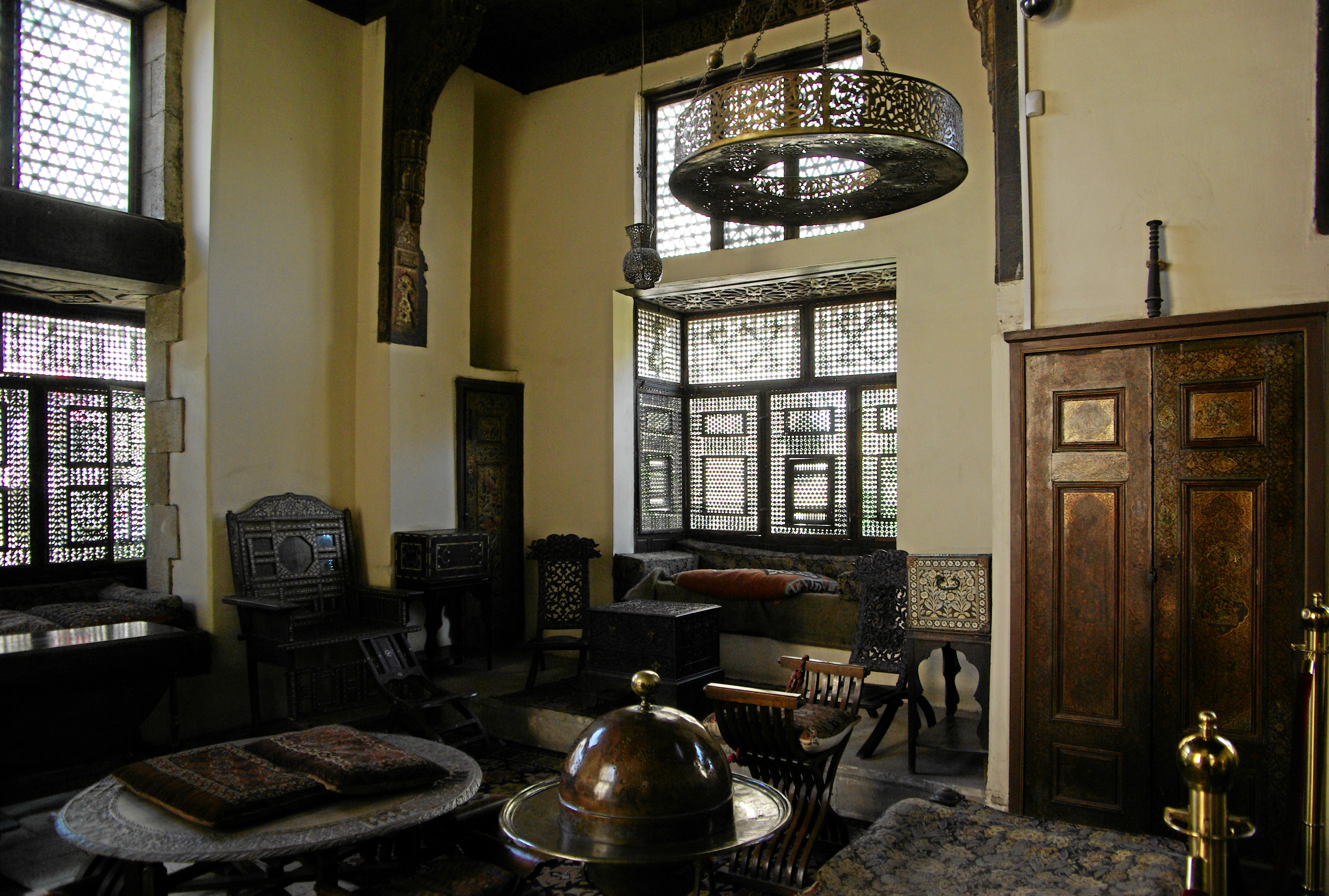

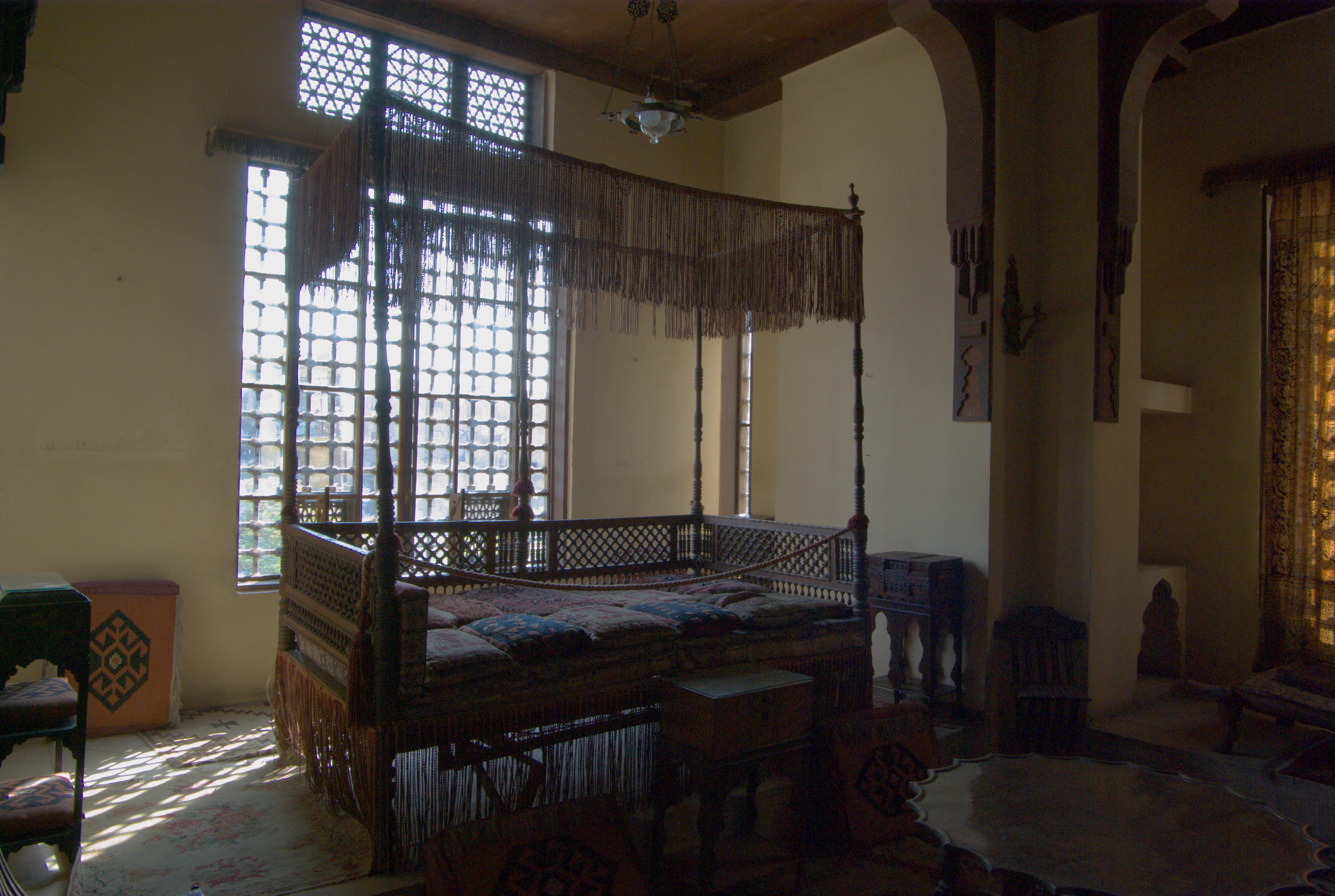

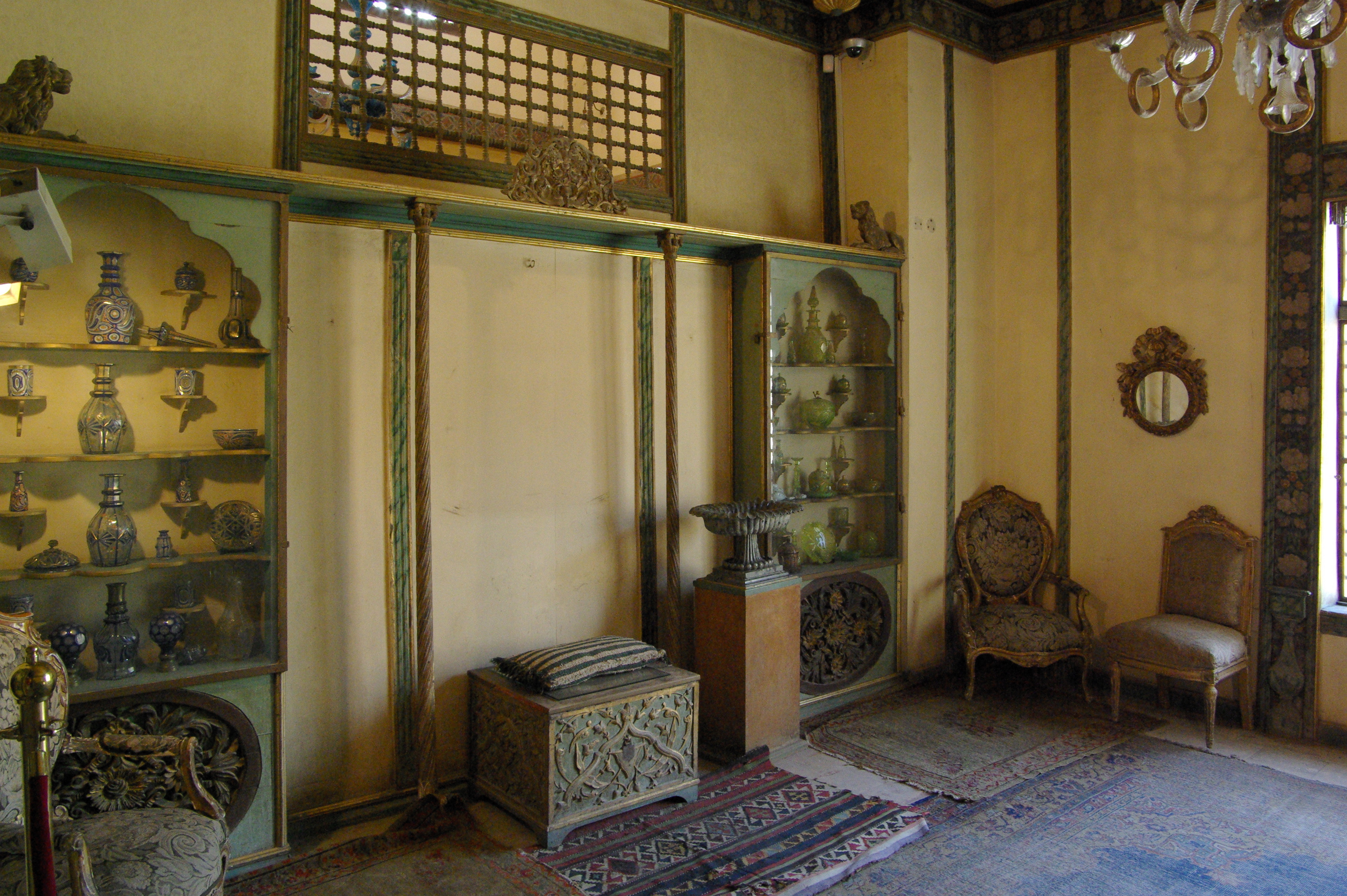

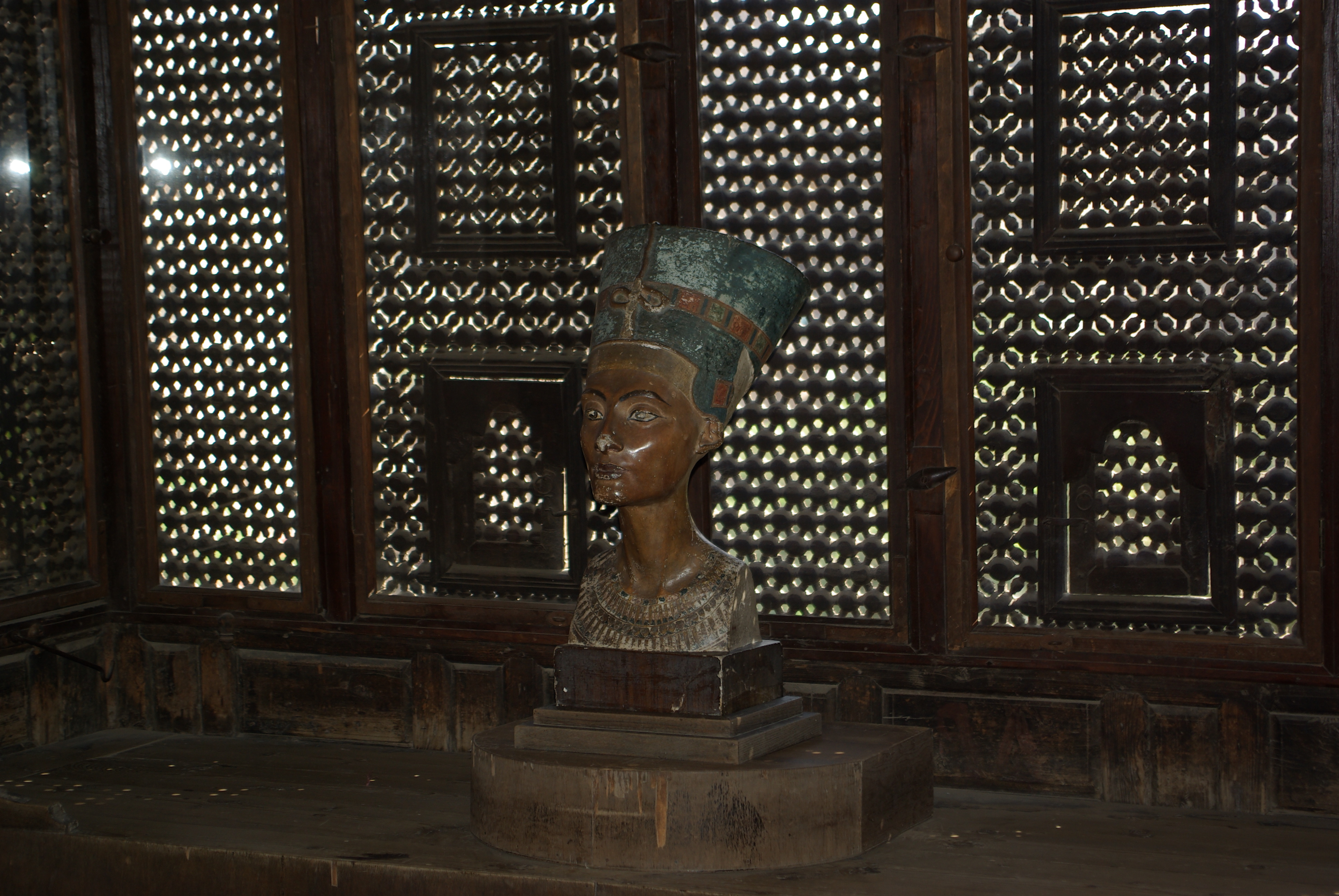

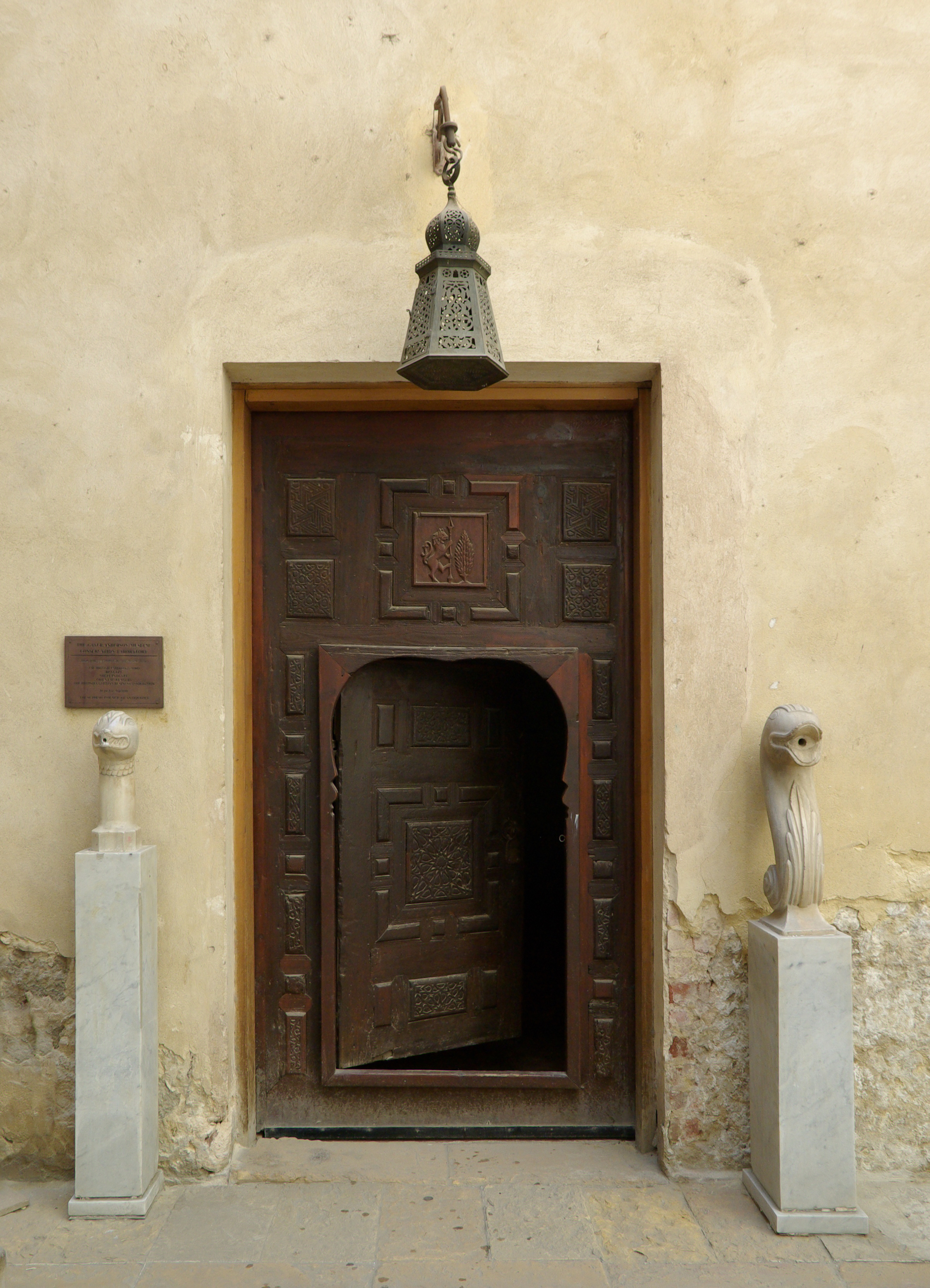

== See also ==
- Museum travel guide
- List of museums in Egypt
