= Uncial 0277 =

- New Testament manuscript
- Text: Matthew 14:22,28-29
- Date: 7th/8th century
- Script: Greek-Coptic diglot
- Now at: Instituto Papirologico "G. Vitelli"
- Size: [7.7] x [7.6] cm
- Type: ?
- Category: ?

Uncial 0277 (in the Gregory-Aland numbering), is a Greek-Coptic uncial manuscript of the New Testament. Palaeographically it has been assigned to the 7th or 8th century.

== Description ==
The codex contains small parts of the Gospel of Matthew 14:22,28-29, on 1 parchment leaf (7.7 cm by 7.6 cm). The text is written in one column per page, 7 lines per page, in uncial letters, the leaf has survived in a fragmentary condition. It uses pagination, the number of page is 44.

== Location ==
Currently it is dated by the INTF to the 7th or 8th century.

The manuscript was found in Egypt.

The text was published by Paola Pruneti in 1983.

Currently the codex is housed at the Instituto Papirologico "G. Vitelli" (PSI Inv. CNR 32 C) in Florence.

== See also ==
- List of New Testament uncials
- Biblical manuscript
- Textual criticism
