= Tjesraperet =

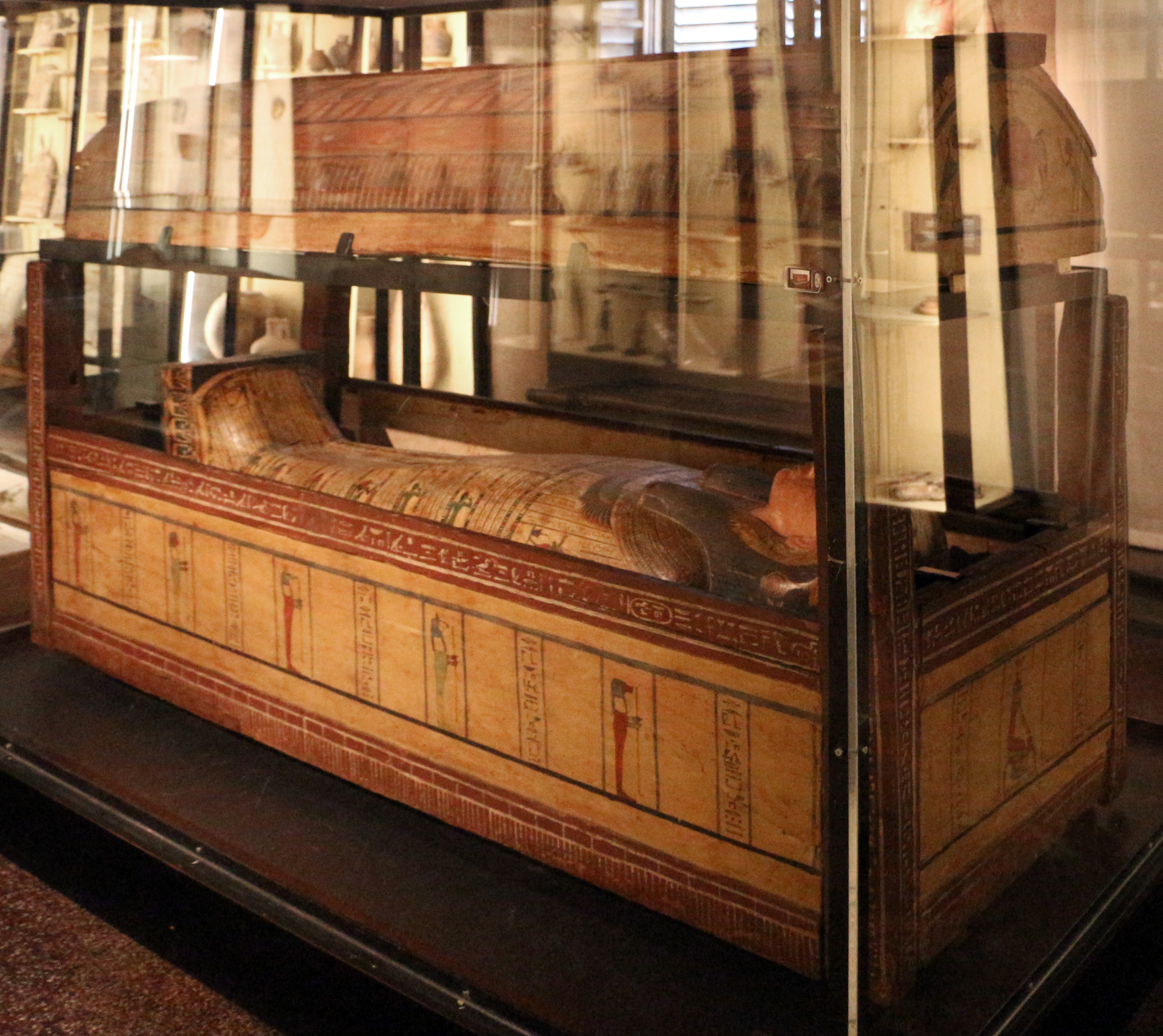
The two coffins of Tjesrapert in Room VIII of the National Archaeological Museum of Florence

S24 z ra Z1 r a pr&r&t U13 N33A
Tjesraperet
in hieroglyphs
Era: 3rd Intermediate Period
(1069–664 BC)

Tjesraperet (ṯs-rˁ-pr.t, "May Ra grant progeny") was the wet nurse of a daughter of the Nubian king Taharqa. She is mainly known from her burial which was found undisturbed.

The burial of Tjesraperet was discovered in Thebes on the 20 May 1829 by an expedition under Jean-Francois Champollion and Ippolito Rosellini. The tomb not only contained her burial but also that of her alleged husband Djedkhonsuefankh who was God's Father of Amun and Lesonis of the temple of Khons. Tjesraperet was also lady of the house and wet nurse of Taharqo's daughter. The name of Taharqo's daughter is not known. Most of the objects found were brought to Italy and are now in the National Archaeological Museum of Florence. The tomb was found in the early years of archaeology. Therefore, the recording and publication of the tomb is very brief and it is today problematic to reconstruct the original contents.

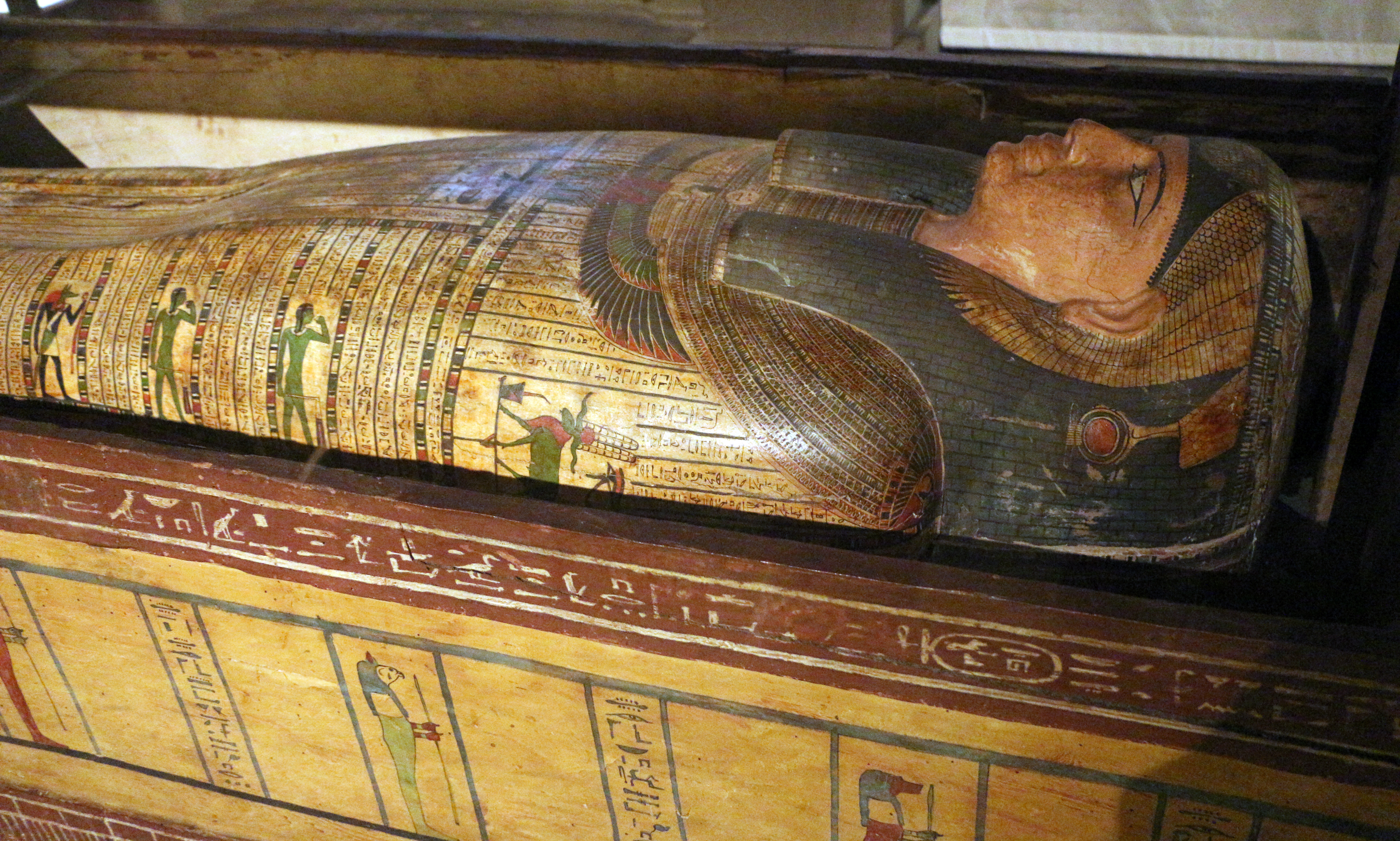
Inner coffin of Tjesraperet

The following objects are known from the tomb: box shaped outer coffin of Tjesraperet, inner anthropoid coffin and a fragment of the second anthropoid coffin of the wet nurse, stela of Djedkhonsuefankh with gilded figures, a mirror with mirror case, a kohl pot with stick. These objects are now all in Florence. Some other objects are known to have arrived in France, as the stela of Tjesraperet now in the Louvre museum and the Ptah-Sokar-Osiris figure in her name, which has been identified in the Musée des Beaux-Arts de Dijon. Other artifacts from the tomb are described in the old publication but are not yet identified in any modern collection. Perhaps they are still in Egypt: a basket with eggs, a clay pot with grain, the coffin of Djedkhonsuefankh, four canopic jars, another statue of Ptah-Sokar-Osiris, three clay boxes with shabtis, a jackal figure and sparrow-hawk statuettes.

== Bibliography ==
- Giuseppe Gabrieli: Ippolito Rosellini e il suo Giornale della Spedizione Letteraria Toscana in Egitto negli anni 1828-1829, Roma, 1925.
- Christian Greco: Il sarcofago esterno di Tjesraperet, dimora per l’eternità, in: Maria Cristina Guidotti, Francesco Tiradritti: Rinascimento Faraonico. La XXV dinastia nel Museo Egizio di Firenze, Montepulciano, 2009, pp. 21–26.
- Maria Cristina Guidotti: The Burial Furniture of Tjes-ra-peret, the Wet Nurse of Taharqo's Daughter, in: Francesco Tiraditti (editor): Pharaonic Renaissance, Ljubljana 2008. ISBN 978-961-6157-33-9, pp. 130–135.
- Maria Cristina Guidotti, Francesco Tiradritti: Rinascimento Faraonico. La XXV dinastia nel Museo Egizio di Firenze, Montepulciano, 2009.
- Jean Leclant: Recherches sur les monuments thébains de la XXV e dynastie dite éthiopienne, Le Caire, 1965.
- Hermann Ranke: Die ägyptische Personennamen, Verlag von J. J. Augustin in Glückstadt, 1935.
- Carlo Rindi: The Ptah-Sokar-Osiris Figure of Tjesraperet, Wet Nurse of Pharaoh Taharka's daughter. Typological and Historical Analysis, «Bulletin de la Société d'Égyptologie Genève», 2011-2013, 29, pp. 131–144.
- Ippolito Rosellini: I Monumenti dell'Egitto e della Nubia. Parte seconda, monumenti civili, Vol. I, Pisa 1834.
- Christiane Ziegler: Champollion en Égypte. Inventaire des antiquités rapportées au Musée du Louvre, in Luc Limme, Jan Strybol: Aegyptus Museis rediviva. Miscellanea in honorem Hermanni de Meulenaere, Brussels, 1993, pp. 197–213.
