= Maat =

Egyptian deity and concepts of truth, order and justice

Maʽat
- Goddess of Order
- Maʽat is both the goddess and the personification of truth, cosmic balance, and justice. Her ostrich feather represents the truth.
Name in hieroglyphs
U5 a t C10 H6 U5 D36 X1 Y1 Z1 Z1 Z1 Z1 U1 Aa11 X1 C10 C10 U5 D42 X1 Y1 Z2 I12 U5 D42 X1 H6 C10 Y1 Z3 H6 X1 H8 C10
- Major cult center: All ancient Egyptian cities
- Symbol: scales, ostrich feather, Balance
- Parents: Ra and Hathor
- Consort: Thoth
- Offspring: Seshat

Maʽat /ˈmeɪ.æt/ or Maat /ˈmɑːt/ (Egyptian: mꜣꜥt /ˈmuʀʕat/, Coptic: ⲙⲉⲓ) is the ancient Egyptian concept of truth, balance, law, morality, and justice. Maat was also the goddess who personified this concept and regulated the stars, seasons, and the actions of mortals and the deities who had brought order from chaos at the moment of creation. Her ideological opposite was Isfet (Egyptian jzft), meaning injustice, chaos, violence or to do evil.

== Pronunciation ==
Cuneiform texts indicate that the word mꜣꜥt was pronounced /múʔʕa/ during the New Kingdom of Egypt, having lost the feminine ending t. Vowel assimilation of u to e later produced the Coptic word ⲙⲉⲉ/ⲙⲉ "truth, justice".

== History ==
The earliest surviving records indicating that Maat is the norm for nature and society, in this world and the next, were recorded during the Old Kingdom of Egypt, the earliest substantial surviving examples being found in the Pyramid Texts of Unas (c. 2375 BCE and 2345 BCE).

Later, when most goddesses were paired with a male aspect, her masculine counterpart was Thoth, as their attributes are similar. In other accounts, Thoth was paired off with Seshat, goddess of writing and measure, who is a lesser-known deity.

After her role in creation and continuously preventing the universe from returning to chaos, her primary role in ancient Egyptian religion dealt with the Weighing of the Heart that took place in the Duat. Her feather was the measure that determined whether the souls (considered to reside in the heart) of the departed would reach the paradise of the afterlife successfully. In other versions, Maat was the feather as the personification of truth, justice, and harmony.

Pharaohs are often depicted with the emblems of Maat to emphasise their roles in upholding the laws and righteousness. From the Eighteenth Dynasty (c. 1550 – 1295 BC) Maat was described as the daughter of Ra, indicating that pharaohs were believed to rule through her authority.

== Goddess ==
Maat was the goddess of harmony, justice, and truth represented as a young woman. Sometimes she is depicted with wings on each arm or as a woman with an ostrich feather on her head. The meaning of this emblem is uncertain, although the god Shu, who in some myths is Maat's brother, also wears it. Depictions of Maat as a goddess are recorded from as early as the middle of the Old Kingdom (c. 2680 to 2190 BCE).

The sun-god Ra came from the primaeval mound of creation only after he set his daughter Maat in place of isfet (chaos). Kings inherited the duty to ensure Maat remained in place, and they with Ra are said to "live on Maat", with Akhenaten (r. 1372–1355 BCE) in particular emphasising the concept to a degree that the king's contemporaries viewed as intolerance and fanaticism. (Note: Breasted (1906), p. 123: An inscription of Hatshepsut reads: "I have made bright the truth which he [Amun-Re] loved, [I] know that he liveth by it the truth [Maat]; it is my bread, I eat of its brightness.") Some kings incorporated Maat into their names, being referred to as Lords of Maat, or Meri-Maat (Beloved of Maat).

Maat had a central role in the ceremony of the Weighing of the Heart, where the decedent's heart was weighed against her feather.

== Principle ==
Maat represents the ethical and moral principle that all Egyptian citizens were expected to follow throughout their daily lives. They were expected to act with honor and truth in matters that involve family, the community, the nation, the environment, and the gods.

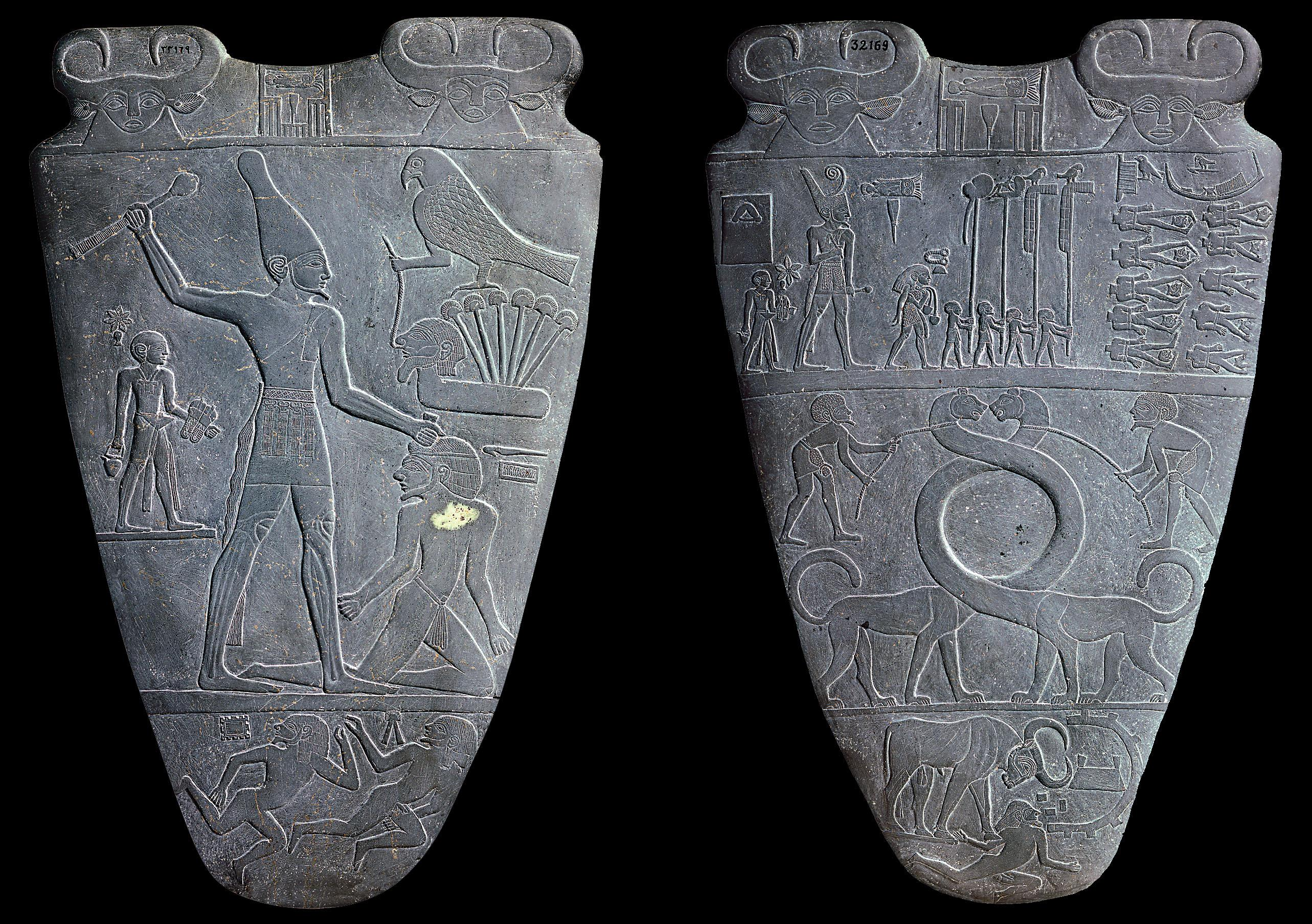
Narmer Palette: representation of victory over chaos

Maat as a principle was formed to meet the complex needs of the emergent Egyptian state that embraced diverse peoples with conflicting interests. The development of such rules sought to avert chaos and it became the basis of Egyptian law. From an early period the king would describe himself as the "Lord of Maat" who decreed with his mouth the Maat he conceived in his heart.

The significance of Maat developed to the point that it embraced all aspects of existence, including the basic equilibrium of the universe, the relationship between constituent parts, the cycle of the seasons, heavenly movements, religious observations and good faith, honesty, and truthfulness in social interactions.

The ancient Egyptians had a deep conviction of an underlying holiness and unity within the universe. Cosmic harmony was achieved by correct public and ritual life. Any disturbance in cosmic harmony could have consequences for the individual as well as the state. An impious king could bring about famine, and blasphemy could bring blindness to an individual. In opposition to the right order expressed in the concept of Maat is the concept of Isfet: chaos, lies and violence.

In addition, several other principles within ancient Egyptian law were essential, including an adherence to tradition as opposed to change, the importance of rhetorical skill and the significance of achieving impartiality and "righteous action". In one Middle Kingdom (2062 to c. 1664 BCE) text, the creator declares "I made every man like his fellow". Maat called the rich to help the less fortunate rather than exploit them, echoed in tomb declarations: "I have given bread to the hungry and clothed the naked" and "I was a husband to the widow and father to the orphan".

To the Egyptian mind, Maat bound all things together in an indestructible unity: the universe, the natural world, the state, and the individual were all seen as parts of the wider order generated by Maat.

A passage in the Instruction of Ptahhotep presents Maat as follows:

Maat is good and its worth is lasting.
It has not been disturbed since the day of its creator,
whereas he who transgresses its ordinances is punished.
It lies as a path in front even of him who knows nothing.
Wrongdoing has never yet brought its venture to port.
It is true that evil may gain wealth but the strength of truth is that it lasts;
a man can say: "It was the property of my father."

=== Law ===
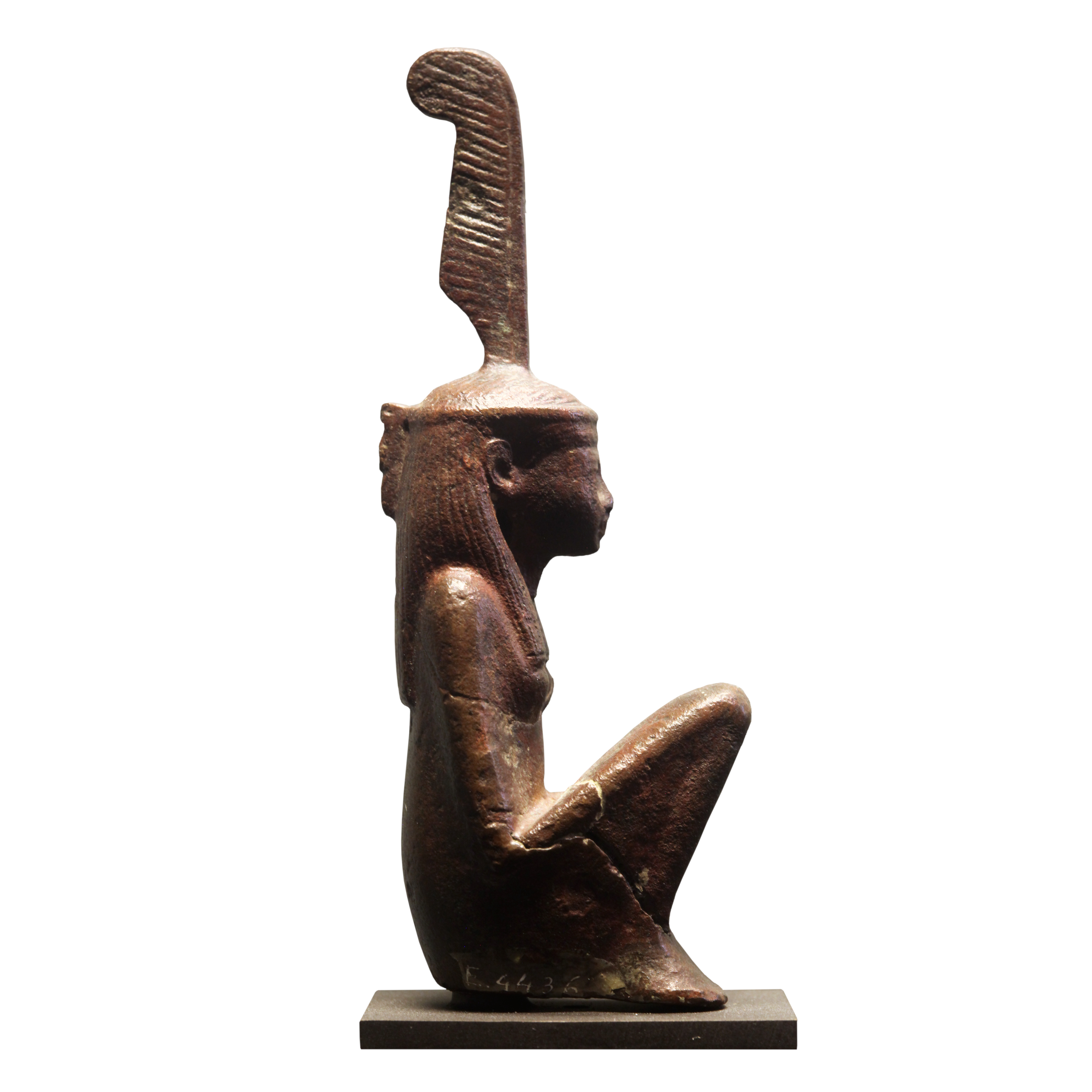
Statue of Maat, adorned with the ostrich feather of truth

There is little surviving literature that describes the practice of ancient Egyptian law. Maat was the spirit in which justice was applied rather than the detailed legalistic exposition of rules. Maat represented the normal and basic values that formed the backdrop for the application of justice that had to be carried out in the spirit of truth and fairness. From the Fifth Dynasty (c. 2510–2370 BCE) onwards, the vizier responsible for justice was called the Priest of Maat and in later periods judges wore images of Maat.

Later scholars and philosophers also would embody concepts from the Sebayt, a native wisdom literature. These spiritual texts dealt with common social or professional situations, and how each was best to be resolved or addressed in the spirit of Maat. It was very practical advice, and highly case-based, so few specific and general rules could be derived from them.

During the Greek period in Egyptian history, Greek law existed alongside Egyptian law. The Egyptian law preserved the rights of women, who were allowed to act independently of men and own substantial personal property, and in time, this influenced the more restrictive conventions of the Greeks and Romans. When the Romans took control of Egypt, the Roman legal system, which existed throughout the Roman Empire, was imposed in Egypt.

== Scribes and scribal school ==
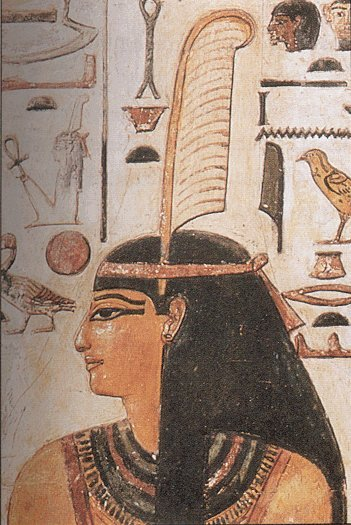
Maat wearing the feather of truth

=== Scribes ===
The ethical aspect of Maat gave rise to the social formation of groups of elite individuals called sesh referring to intellectuals, scribes, or bureaucrats. Besides serving as the civil servant of the kingdom, the sesh had a central role in the society since the ethical and moral concepts of Maat were further formulated, promoted, and maintained by these individuals. Scribes in particular held prestigious positions in ancient Egyptian society as they were a primary means for the transmission of religious, political, and commercial information.

Although few were formally literate, writing was an important part of citizens' lives in Ancient Egypt, and scribes, for the large part, carried out literate functions for large masses of individuals. Since everyone was taxed, for example, their contributions were recorded by scribes. During periods of natural disasters, additionally, scribes worked on distant assignments, which were often in the form of letters. These letters were written and read by scribes for those who were not literate which enabled communication with superiors and families.

Written texts were often read aloud in public by scribes, who also wrote most of the letters, regardless of the sender's writing ability. Thus, scribes were involved in both writing and reading the letters. Since scribes read the letters out loud in public, they could not use the first person to present the king's voice. Thus, the texts were presented in the third person grammatical structure. However, much of ancient Egyptian writing was symbolic and operated on a much deeper level than narratives might suggest. Religious concerns, as well as the hierarchical structure of Ancient Egyptian society, created important distinctions between elite classes and everyone else. The political and ideological interests of the elite dominated and directed the majority of social and cultural life in Ancient Egypt. Rhetoric has also been acknowledged as playing a role in the maintenance of social hierarchies, with its priorities of maintaining harmony and social order.

Illiterate people had a priority to get scribes to their villages because this procedure allowed the government to limit excessive abuses by pointing out the importance of the complaints of the poor. Scribal instructional texts emphasize fair treatment of all peoples and how anyone who abuses their power is subject to punishment. Although this procedure was regulated by the local government, it helped provide the poor with the feeling that their petitions were put before higher officials' requests. Although the main responsibility of scribes was to compose the work, transfer it or communicate, some scribes added additional commentary. The scribe's role in judicial system should also be taken into consideration. Local and insignificant crimes were usually led by a scribe or a foreman during the trial.

Thoth was the patron of scribes who is described as the one "who reveals Maat and reckons Maat; who loves Maat and gives Maat to the doer of Maat". In texts such as the Instruction of Amenemope the scribe is urged to follow the precepts of Maat in his private life as well as his work. The exhortations to live according to Maat are such that these kinds of instructional texts have been described as "Maat Literature".

=== Scribal schools ===
Scribal schools emerged during the Middle Kingdom Era (2060–1700 BCE). Although scribal practices had been implemented before this period, there is no evidence of "systematic schooling" occurring in a materialized institution during the Old Kingdom (2635–2155 BCE). Scribal schools were designed to transform people to the literate sesh or scribes who could function for society and bureaucracy. Therefore, literacy among ancient Egyptians revolved around the mastery of writing and reading in their specific purposes of conducting administration.

In scribal schools, students were selectively chosen based on the same date of birth around Egypt. Most of the apprentice scribes were boys, but some privileged girls received similar instruction as the boys in the scribal schools. They could either live at school with their peers or stay with their parents, depending on geographical adjacency. The students were taught two types of writing by their teachers who were priests: sacred writing and instructive writing. Sacred writing emphasized Maat and its moral as well as ethical values and instructions, while instructive writing covered specific discussion about land-measurement and arithmetic for evaluating the annual changes of river and land configurations; as well as for calculating tax, logging commercial business, and distributing supply.

Learning instructions in scribal schools were available for very young prospective students (5–10 years old students). This elementary instruction took 4 years to complete, and then, they could become apprentices of a tutor – an advanced level of education that elevated their scribal careers. In the elementary level, pupils received instructions from the tutors while sitting in circle around the tutors. The lessons were implemented in different fashions: reading was recited aloud or chanted, arithmetic was studied mutely, and writing was practiced by copying classical short literacy and the Miscellanies, a short composition specifically aimed to teach writing.

When learning writing, scribal apprentices were required to go over sequential steps. They firstly had to memorize a brief passage by chanted recital following the teachers. Later on, they were asked to copy some paragraphs to train their writing abilities, either on ostraca or wooden tablets. Once the instructors deemed the pupil had made some progress, they would assign the same first two steps toward Middle Egyptian manuscripts, consisting of classical work and instructions. After that, the same methods were implemented to Middle Egyptian texts, in which grammar and vocabulary took the most part.

Besides honing reading, writing, and arithmetic skills, students of scribal schools also learned other skills. Male students were involved in physical training, while female students were asked to practice singing, dancing, and musical instruments.

== As rhetorical concept ==
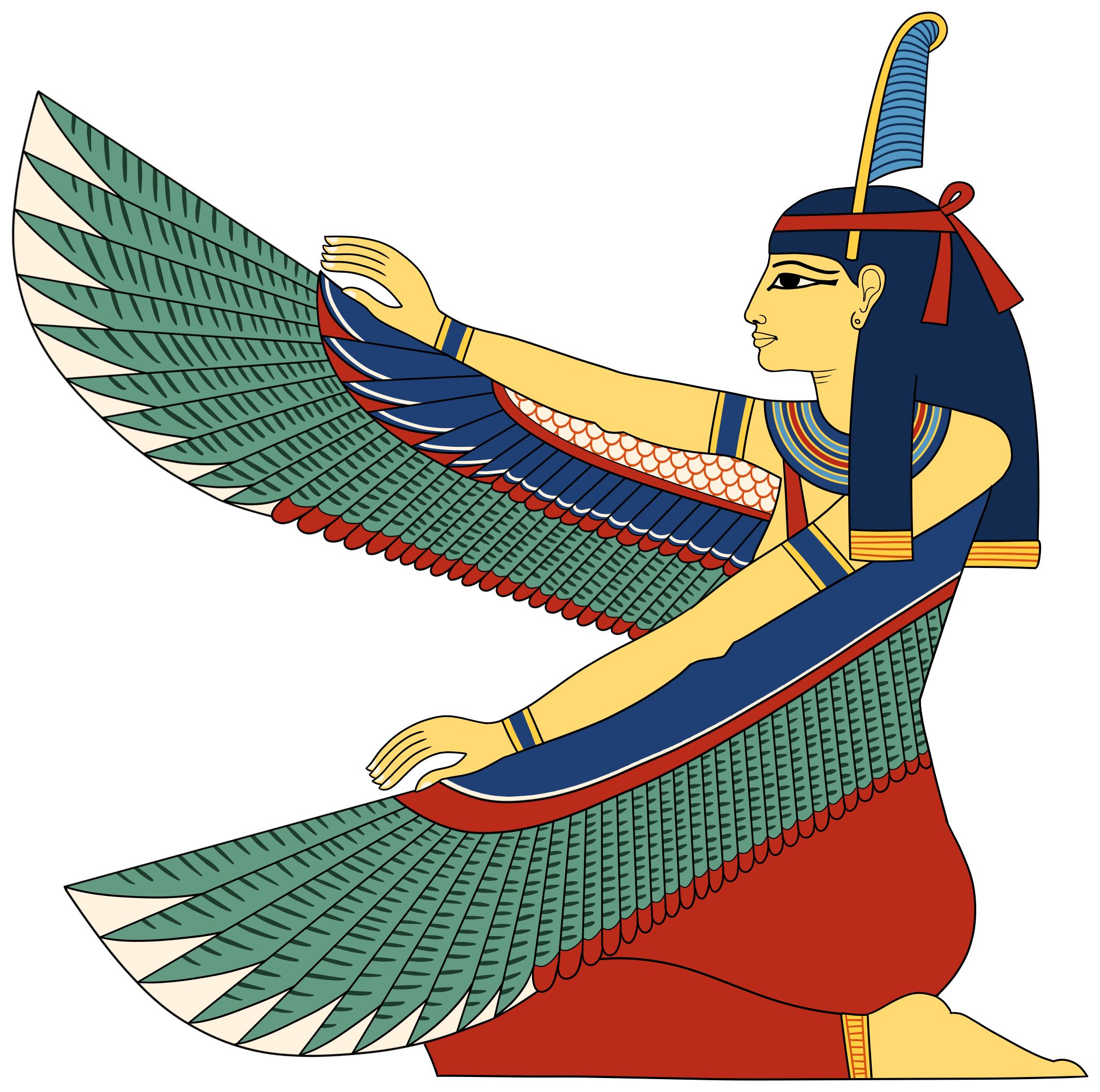
Winged Maat, depicted in The Tomb of Nefertari (1255 BCE)

Although little mythology survives concerning the goddess Maat, she was the daughter of the Egyptian Sun god Ra; and the wife of Thoth, the god of wisdom who invented writing, which directly connects Maat to ancient Egyptian rhetoric. Maat (which is associated with solar, lunar, astral, and the river Nile's movements) is a concept based on humanity's attempt to live in a natural harmonic state. Maat is associated with the judgment of the deceased and whether a person has done what is right in their life. Thus, to do Maat was to act in a manner unreproachable or inculpable. So revered was the concept of Maat that Egyptian kings would often pay tribute to gods, offering small statues of Maat, indicating that they were successfully upholding the universal order: the interconnection among the cosmic, divine, natural, and human realms. When rhetors are attempting to achieve balance in their arguments, they are practicing Maat.

George Kennedy, a history of rhetoric scholar, defines rhetoric as the transmission of emotion and thought through a system of symbols, including words, to influence the emotions and thoughts of others. Maat sought to influence its audience to action as well. Scholars have closely examined this relationship between ancient Egyptian rhetoric and the concept of Maat, using three specific areas: 1) ancient Egyptian texts that actually taught Maat; 2) ancient Egyptian letter writing that embodied the performance of Maat; 3) ancient Egyptian letter writing that used Maat as persuasion

=== In ancient Egyptian texts ===
The Egyptian elite learned how to be part of the elite class through instructions text, such as The Instructions of Ptahhotep, that used Maat as the basis of concrete principles and guidelines for effective rhetoric. A passage from Ptahhotep presents Maat as instruction:

Be generous as long as you live
What leaves the storehouse does not return;
It is the food to be shared which is coveted,
One whose belly is empty is an accuser;
One deprived becomes an opponent,
Don't have him for a neighbor.
Kindness is a man's memorial
For the years after the function.

Another passage emphasizes the importance of Maat and how wisdom was also to be found among the women at the grindstones.

The lesson learned through Maat here is beneficence: the reader is advised to be benevolent and kind. An even stronger argument is being made – if you do not feed people, they will become unruly; on the other hand, if you take care of your people, they will take care of your memorial or tomb The excerpt from Phahhotep employs Maat to teach the reader how to be a more effective king. The Tale of The Eloquent Peasant is an extended discourse on the nature of Maat in which an officer under the direction of the King is described as taking the wealth of a nobleman and giving it to a poor man he had abused. Another text describes how the divine King:

educates the ignorant to wisdom,
and those who are unloved become as those who are loved.
He causes the lesser folk to emulate the great,
the last become as the first.
He who was lacking possessions is (now) the possessor of riches.

=== Performance in ancient Egyptian letters ===
Letter writing became a significant part of the daily function of ancient Egyptian citizens. It became the means of communication between superiors and families; thus, Egyptians became incessant letter writers. Letters were not merely "mailed" to their recipients; they were performed by scribes who often wrote them on behalf of a king. Since language is the basis by which a community identifies itself and others, the scribes would perform Maat to build upon a community's language to become more persuasive.

=== Persuasion in ancient Egyptian letters ===
James Herrick states that the major objective of rhetoric is for a rhetor to persuade (to alter) an audience's view to that of the rhetor; for example, an attorney uses rhetoric to persuade a jury that his/her client is innocent of a crime. Maat in letters written to subordinates to persuade allegiance to them and the pharaoh; subordinates would evoke Maat to illustrate a desire to please. To directly disagree with a superior was considered highly inappropriate; instead, inferior citizens would indirectly evoke Maat to assuage a superior's ego to achieve the desired outcome.

=== Temples ===
The earliest evidence for a dedicated temple is in the New Kingdom (c. 1569 to 1081 BCE) era, despite the great importance placed on Maat. Amenhotep III commissioned a temple in the Karnak complex, whilst textual evidence indicates that other temples of Maat were located in Memphis and at Deir el-Medina. The Maat temple at Karnak was also used by courts to meet regarding the robberies of the royal tombs during the rule of Ramesses IX.

== Afterlife ==
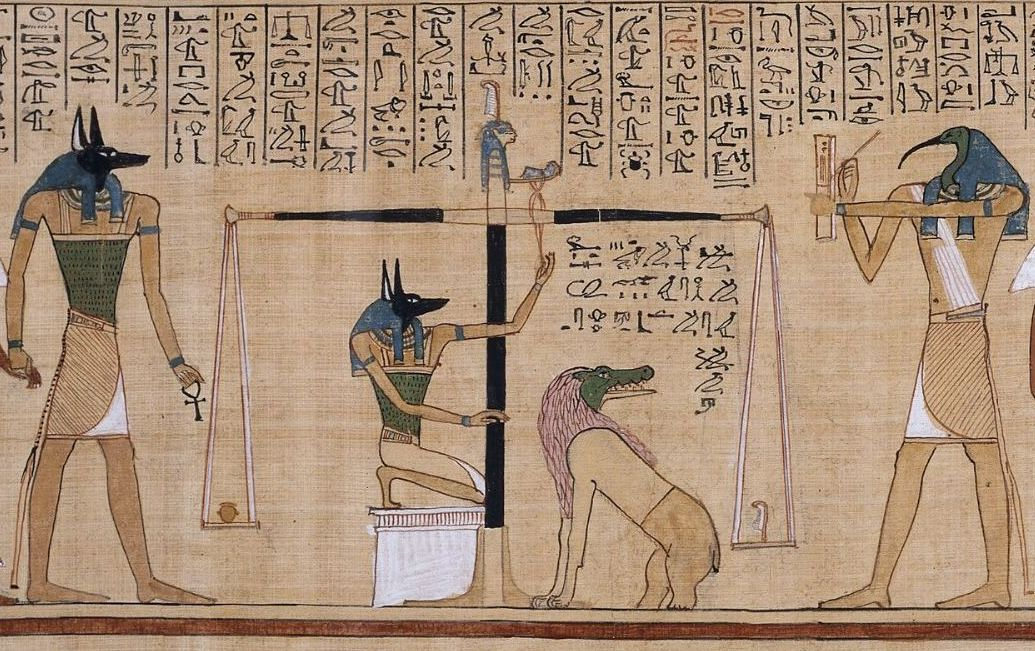
The heart of Hunefer weighed against the feather of Maat

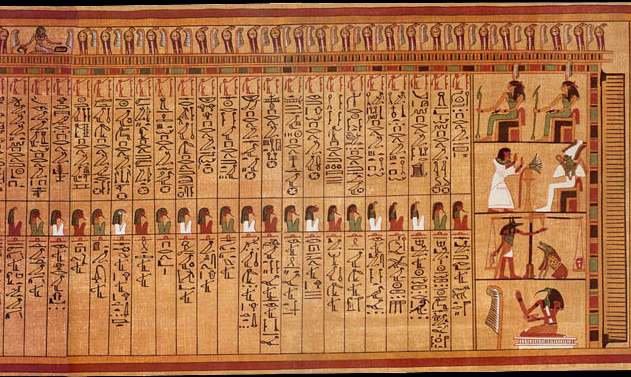
Some of the 42 Judges of Maat are visible, seated and in small size. Maat's feather of truth depicted in the bottom right corner (British Museum, London)

An image based on a section of the Book of the Dead showing the Weighing of the Heart in the Duat using the feather of Maat as the measure in balance

=== Weighing of the Heart ===
In the Duat, the Egyptian underworld, the hearts of the dead were said to be weighed against her single "Feather of Maat", symbolically representing the concept of Maat, in the Hall of Two Truths. This is why hearts were left in Egyptian mummies while their other organs were removed, as the heart (called "ib") was seen as part of the Egyptian soul. If the heart was found to be lighter or equal in weight to the feather of Maat, the deceased had led a virtuous life and would go on to Aaru. Osiris came to be seen as the guardian of the gates of Aaru after he became part of the Egyptian pantheon and displaced Anubis in the Ogdoad tradition. A heart which was unworthy was devoured by the goddess Ammit and its owner condemned to remain in the Duat.

The weighing of the heart, as typically pictured on papyrus in the Book of the Dead, or in tomb scenes, shows Anubis overseeing the weighing and Ammit seated awaiting the results to consume those who failed. The image contains a balancing scale with an upright heart standing on one side and the Shu-feather standing on the other. Other traditions hold that Anubis brought the soul before the posthumous Osiris who performed the weighing. While the heart was weighed the deceased recited the 42 Negative Confessions as the Assessors of Maat looked on.

=== Assessors of Maat ===
The Assessors of Maat are the 42 deities listed in the Papyrus of Nebseni, to whom the deceased make the Negative Confession in the Papyrus of Ani. They represent the forty-two united nomes of Egypt, and are called "the hidden Maati gods, who feed upon Maat during the years of their lives"; i.e., they are the righteous minor deities who deserve offerings. As the deceased follows the set formula of Negative Confessions, he addresses each god directly and mentions the nome of which the god is a patron, in order to emphasize the unity of the nomes of Egypt.

=== Funerary texts ===
Egyptians were often entombed with funerary texts in order to be well equipped for the afterlife as mandated by ancient Egyptian funerary practices. These often served to guide the deceased through the afterlife, and the most famous one is the Book of the Dead or Papyrus of Ani (known to the ancient Egyptians as The Book of Coming Forth by Day). The lines of these texts are often collectively called the "Forty-Two Declarations of Purity". These declarations varied somewhat from tomb to tomb as they were tailored to the individual, and so cannot be considered a canonical definition of Maat. Rather, they appear to express each tomb owner's individual practices in life to please Maat, as well as words of absolution from misdeeds or mistakes, made by the tomb owner in life, which could be declared as not having been done, and through the power of the written word, wipe particular misdeed from the afterlife record of the deceased. Many of the lines are similar, however, and paint a very unified picture of Maat.

The doctrine of Maat is represented in the declarations to Rekhti-merti-f-ent-Maat and the 42 Negative Confessions listed in the Papyrus of Ani. The following are translations by E. A. Wallis Budge.

=== 42 Negative Confessions (Papyrus of Ani) ===
The negative confessions one would make after death could be individualized, that is, vary from person to person. These were the confessions found in the Papyrus of Ani:

1. Hail, Usekh-nemmt, who comest forth from Anu, I have not committed sin.
2. Hail, Hept-khet, who comest forth from Kher-aha, I have not committed robbery with violence.
3. Hail, Fenti, who comest forth from Khemenu, I have not stolen.
4. Hail, Am-khaibit, who comest forth from Qernet, I have not slain men and women.
5. Hail, Neha-her, who comest forth from Rasta, I have not stolen grain.
6. Hail, Ruruti, who comest forth from Heaven, I have not purloined offerings.
7. Hail, Arfi-em-khet, who comest forth from Suat, I have not stolen the property of God.
8. Hail, Neba, who comest and goest, I have not uttered lies.
9. Hail, Set-qesu, who comest forth from Hensu, I have not carried away food.
10. Hail, Utu-nesert, who comest forth from Het-ka-Ptah, I have not uttered curses.
11. Hail, Qerrti, who comest forth from Amentet, I have not committed adultery.
12. Hail, Hraf-haf, who comest forth from thy cavern, I have made none to weep.
13. Hail, Basti, who comest forth from Bast, I have not eaten the heart.
14. Hail, Ta-retiu, who comest forth from the night, I have not attacked any man.
15. Hail, Unem-snef, who comest forth from the execution chamber, I am not a man of deceit.
16. Hail, Unem-besek, who comest forth from Mabit, I have not stolen cultivated land.
17. Hail, Neb-Maat, who comest forth from Maati, I have not been an eavesdropper.
18. Hail, Tenemiu, who comest forth from Bast, I have not slandered anyone.
19. Hail, Sertiu, who comest forth from Anu, I have not been angry without just cause.
20. Hail, Tutu, who comest forth from Ati, I have not debauched the wife of any man.
21. Hail, Uamenti, who comest forth from the Khebt chamber, I have not debauched the wives of other men.
22. Hail, Maa-antuf, who comest forth from Per-Menu, I have not polluted myself.
23. Hail, Her-uru, who comest forth from Nehatu, I have terrorized none.
24. Hail, Khemiu, who comest forth from Kaui, I have not transgressed the law.
25. Hail, Shet-kheru, who comest forth from Urit, I have not been angry.
26. Hail, Nekhenu, who comest forth from Heqat, I have not shut my ears to the words of truth.
27. Hail, Kenemti, who comest forth from Kenmet, I have not blasphemed.
28. Hail, An-hetep-f, who comest forth from Sau, I am not a man of violence.
29. Hail, Sera-kheru, who comest forth from Unaset, I have not been a stirrer up of strife.
30. Hail, Neb-heru, who comest forth from Netchfet, I have not acted with undue haste.
31. Hail, Sekhriu, who comest forth from Uten, I have not pried into other's matters.
32. Hail, Neb-abui, who comest forth from Sauti, I have not multiplied my words in speaking.
33. Hail, Nefer-Tem, who comest forth from Het-ka-Ptah, I have wronged none, I have done no evil.
34. Hail, Tem-Sepu, who comest forth from Tetu, I have not worked witchcraft against the king.
35. Hail, Ari-em-ab-f, who comest forth from Tebu, I have never stopped the flow of water of a neighbor.
36. Hail, Ahi, who comest forth from Nu, I have never raised my voice.
37. Hail, Uatch-rekhit, who comest forth from Sau, I have not cursed God.
38. Hail, Neheb-ka, who comest forth from thy cavern, I have not acted with arrogance.
39. Hail, Neheb-nefert, who comest forth from thy cavern, I have not stolen the bread of the gods.
40. Hail, Tcheser-tep, who comest forth from the shrine, I have not carried away the khenfu cakes from the spirits of the dead.
41. Hail, An-af, who comest forth from Maati, I have not snatched away the bread of the child, nor treated with contempt the god of my city.
42. Hail, Hetch-abhu, who comest forth from Ta-she, I have not slain the cattle belonging to the god.

== Gallery ==
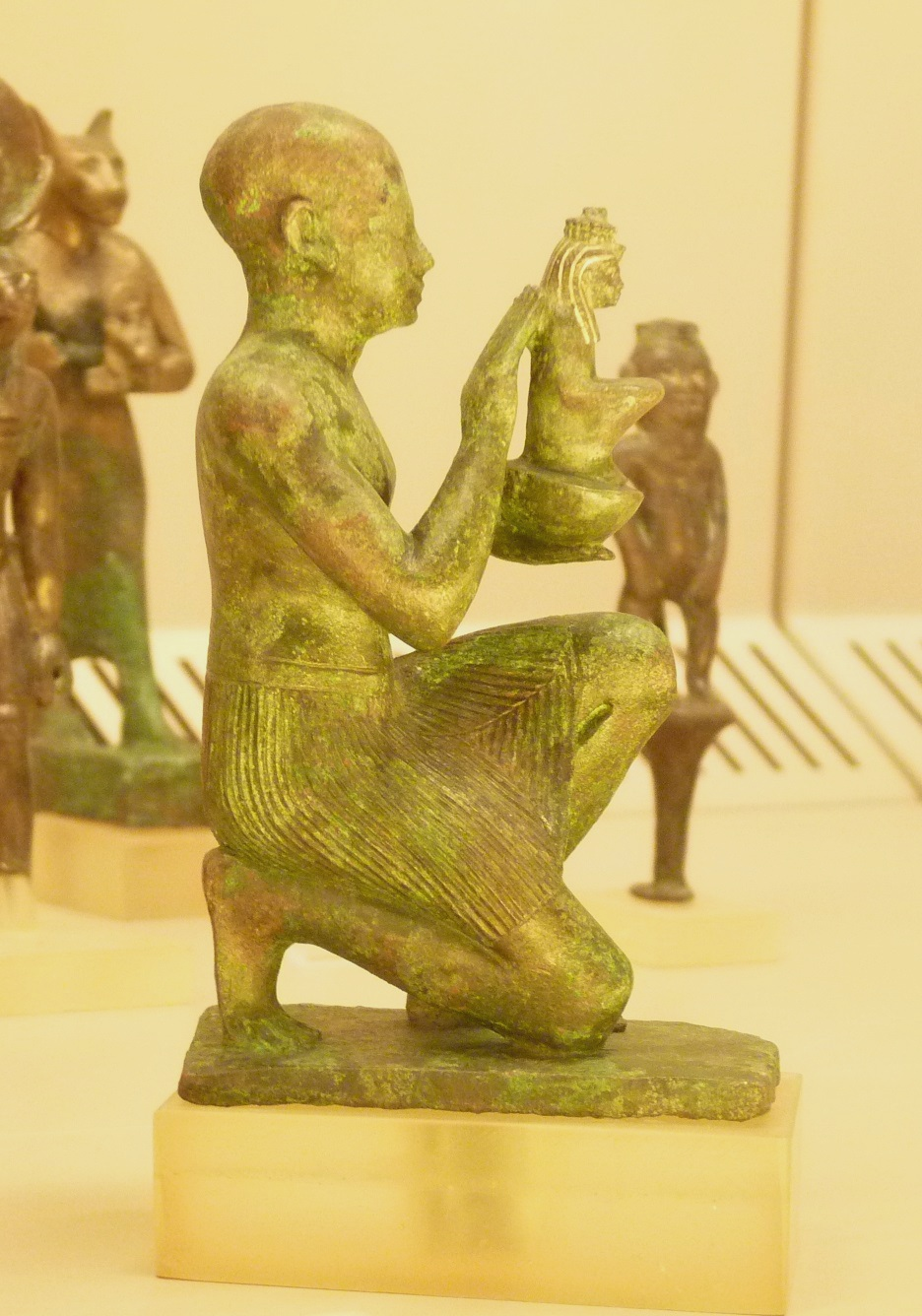
Statuette of a kneeling man, maybe a priest, offering a small Maat figure. Bronze with agemina. Third Intermediate Period/Late Period

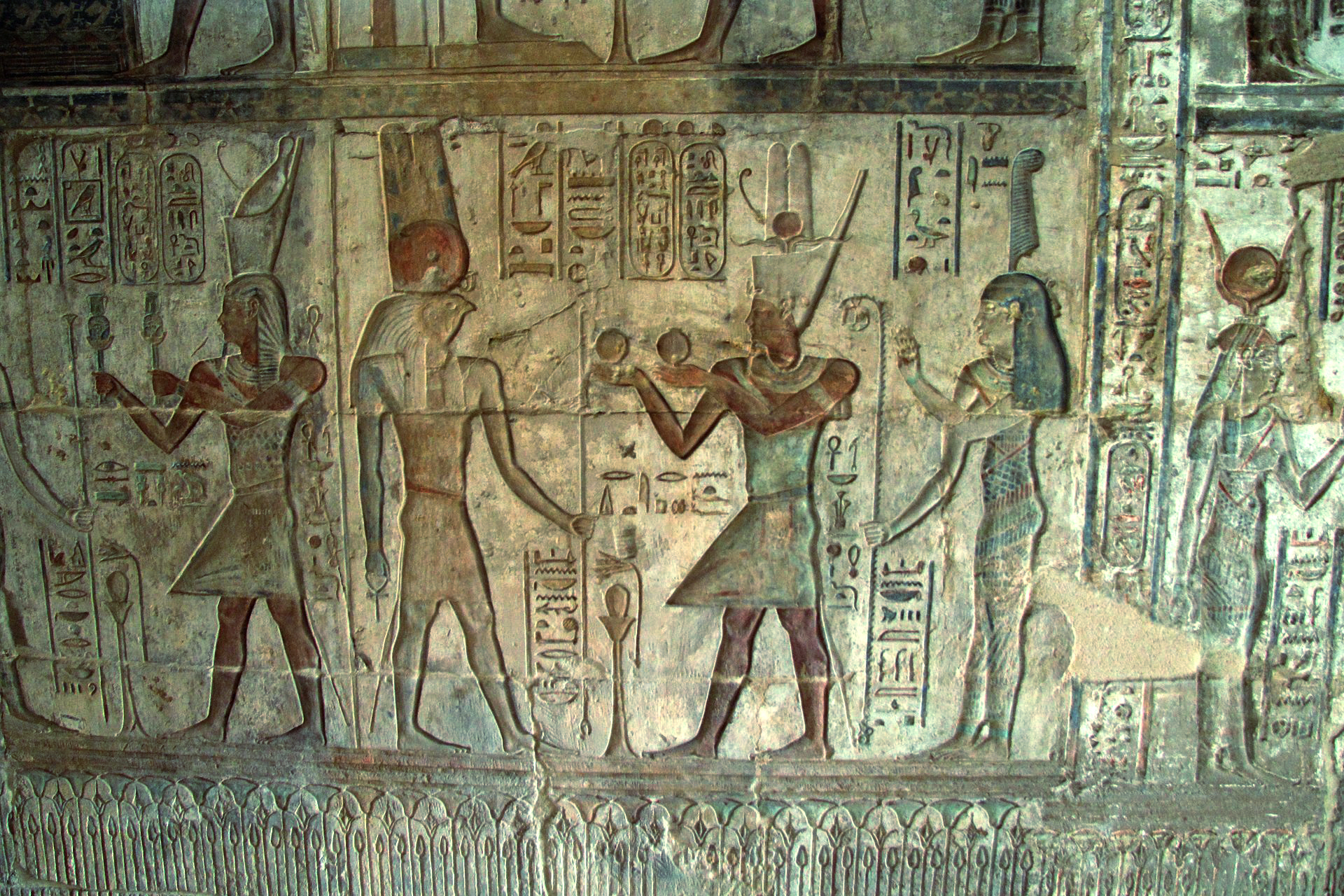
Ancient artisans’ village Deir el-Medina in Upper Egypt

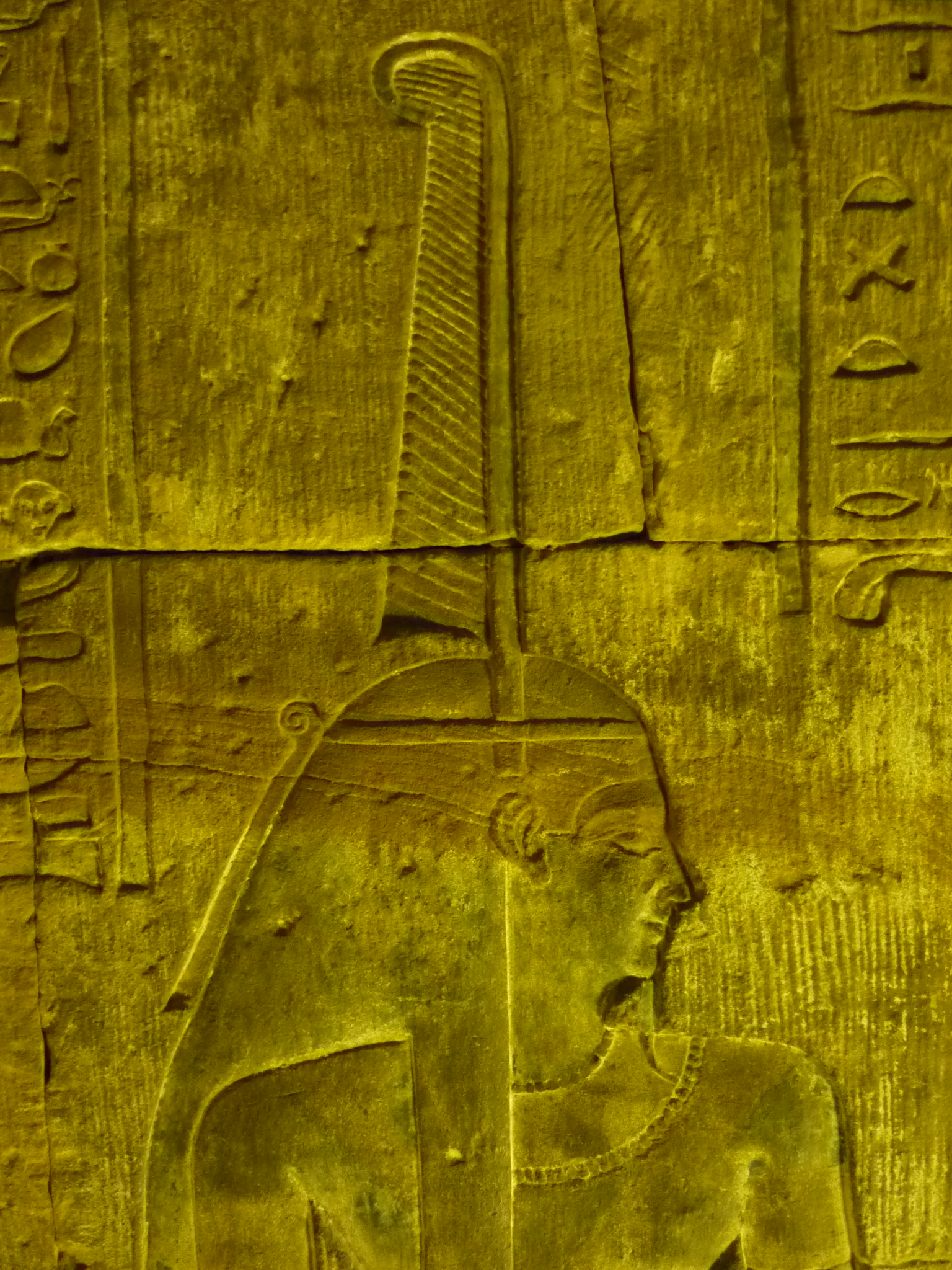
Relief of Maat in east upstairs. Temple of Edfu, Upper Egypt

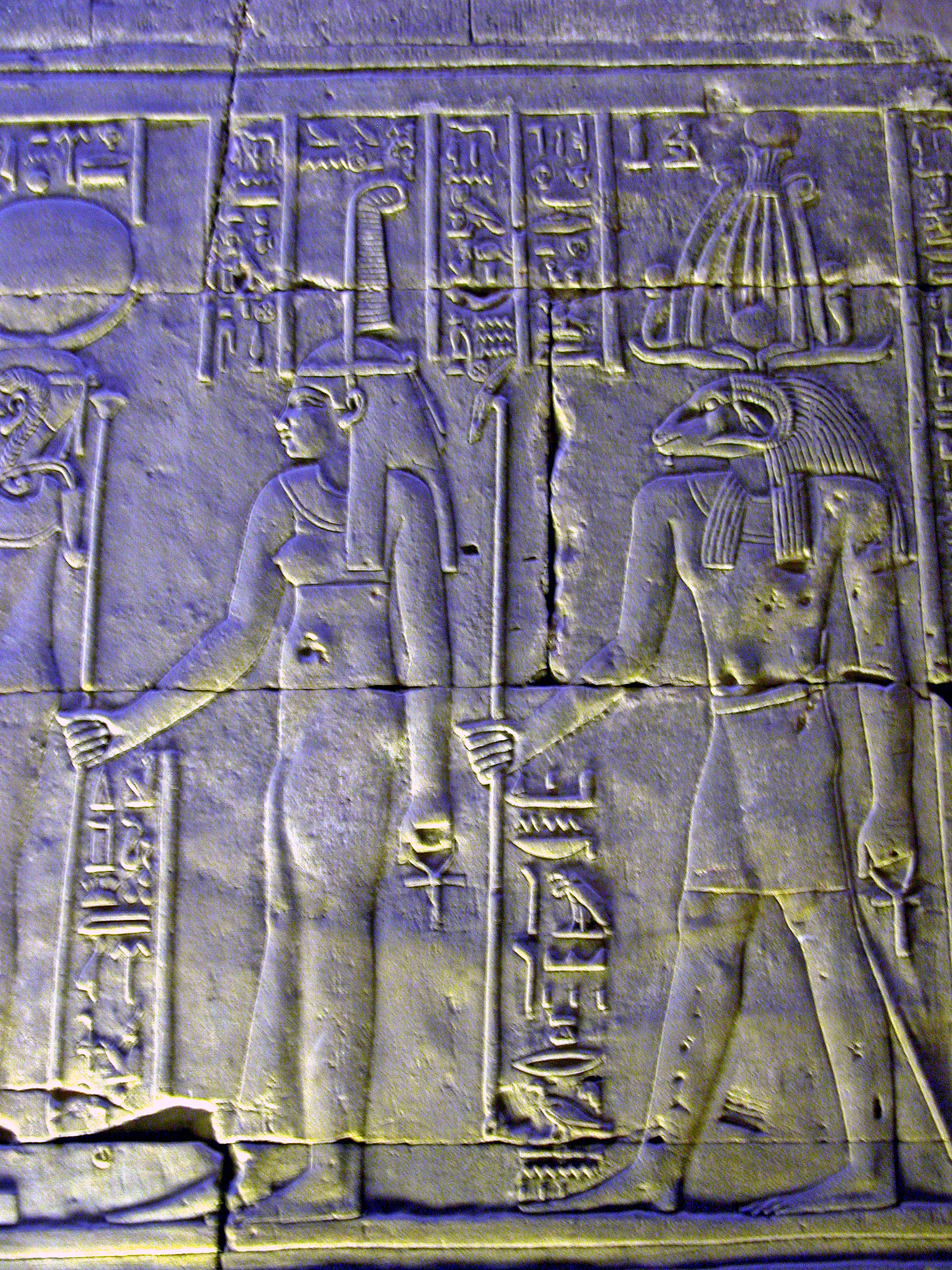
Depiction of the Feast of the Beautiful Meeting, the second reunion between Horus and his wife Hathor. Temple of Edfu, Upper Egypt

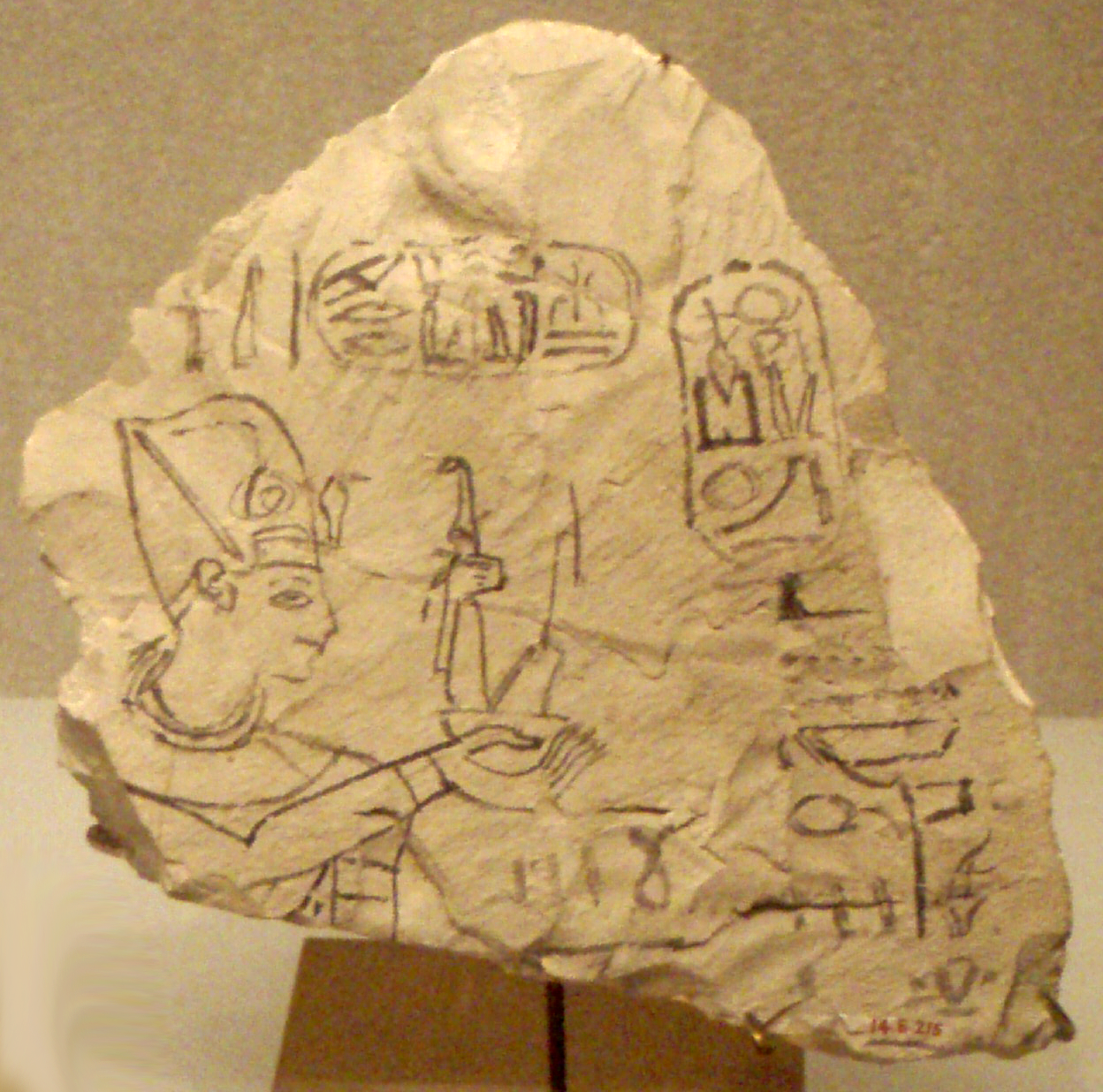
Ostracon depicting the pharaoh Ramesses IX presenting Maat

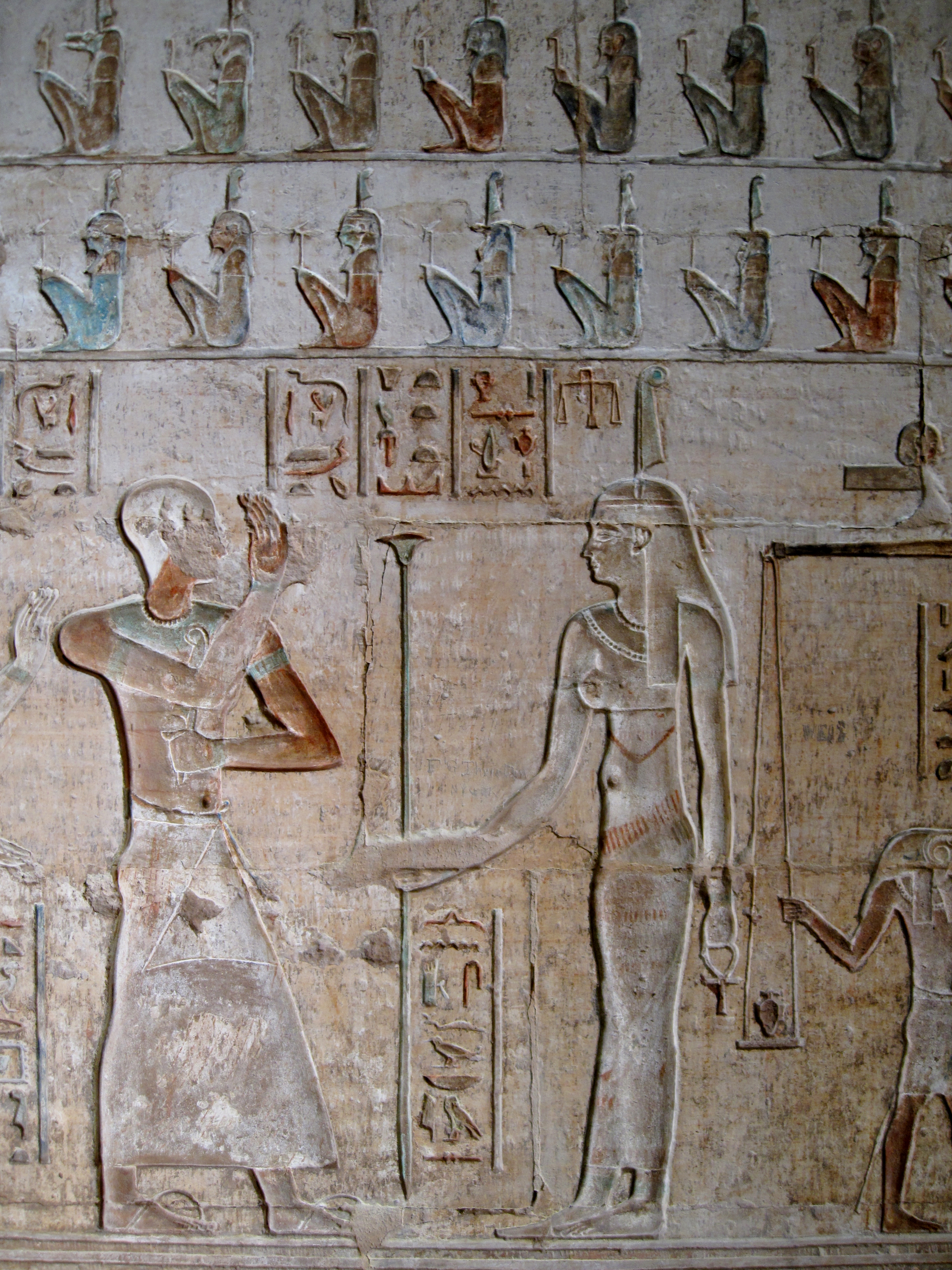
Relief in the inner room of Hathor's temple in Deir el-Medina

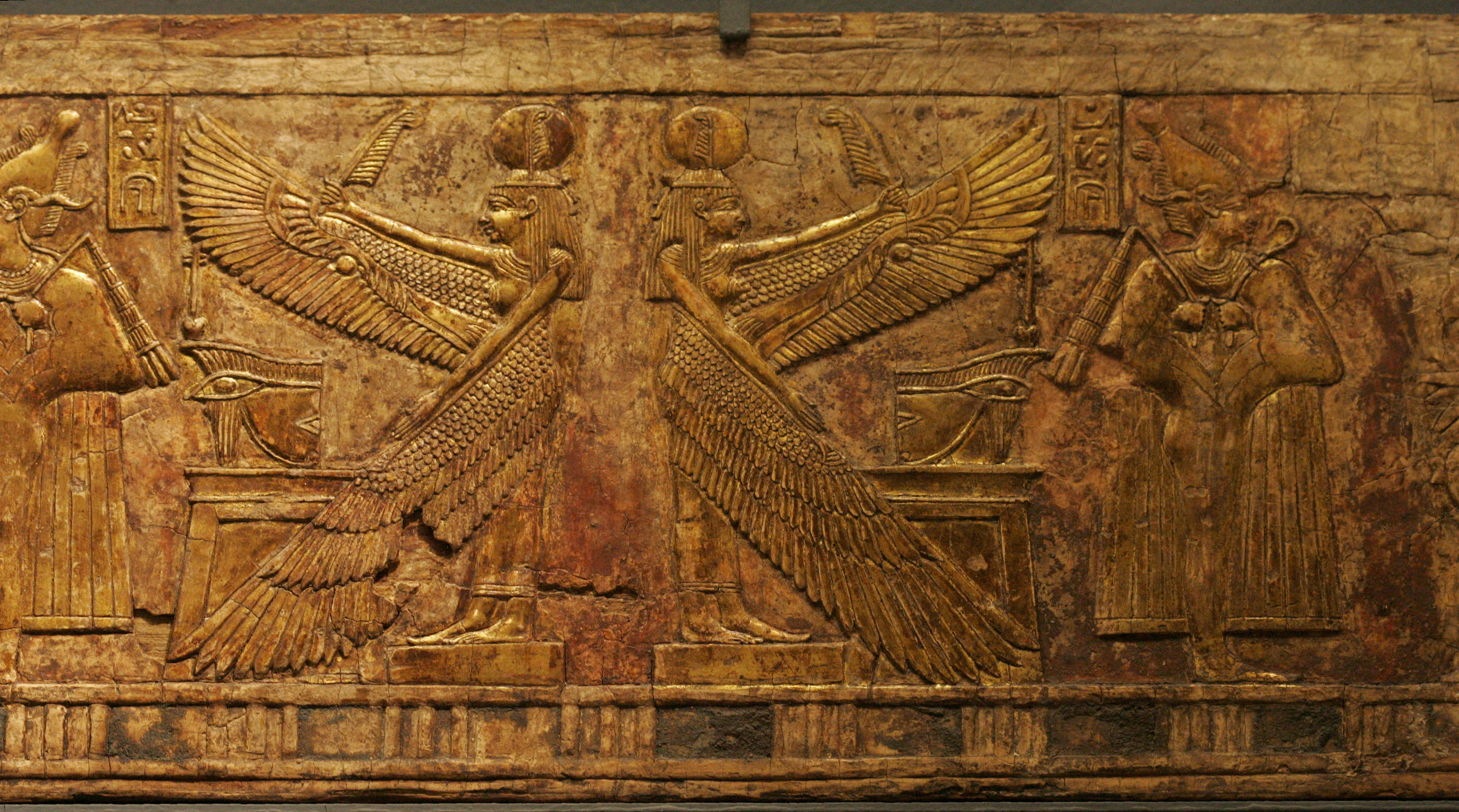
Maat represented with wings

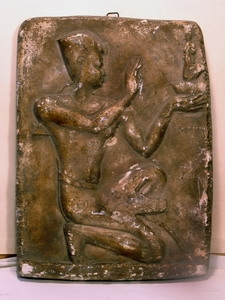
Bas-relief depicting the Egyptian statuette of Maat. Old Kingdom

== See also ==
- Aeon of Ma'at – Cosmic era in the religion of Thelema
- Asha – Central and complex Zoroastrian theological concept
- Dharma – Key concept in Indian philosophy and Eastern religions, with multiple meanings
- Liber Pennae Praenumbra – Sacred text in Thelema
- Me – Sumerian name given to the laws of the gods
- Themis – Greek goddess of divine law
- Maad – Title given to a male monarch by the Serer people of Senegal, Gambia and Mauritania, and sometimes mistakenly confused with the Serer religious title Maat.
