= Relief of Maat =

Tomb painting of goddess of Justice Maat

Relief of Maat (Maat of Florence)
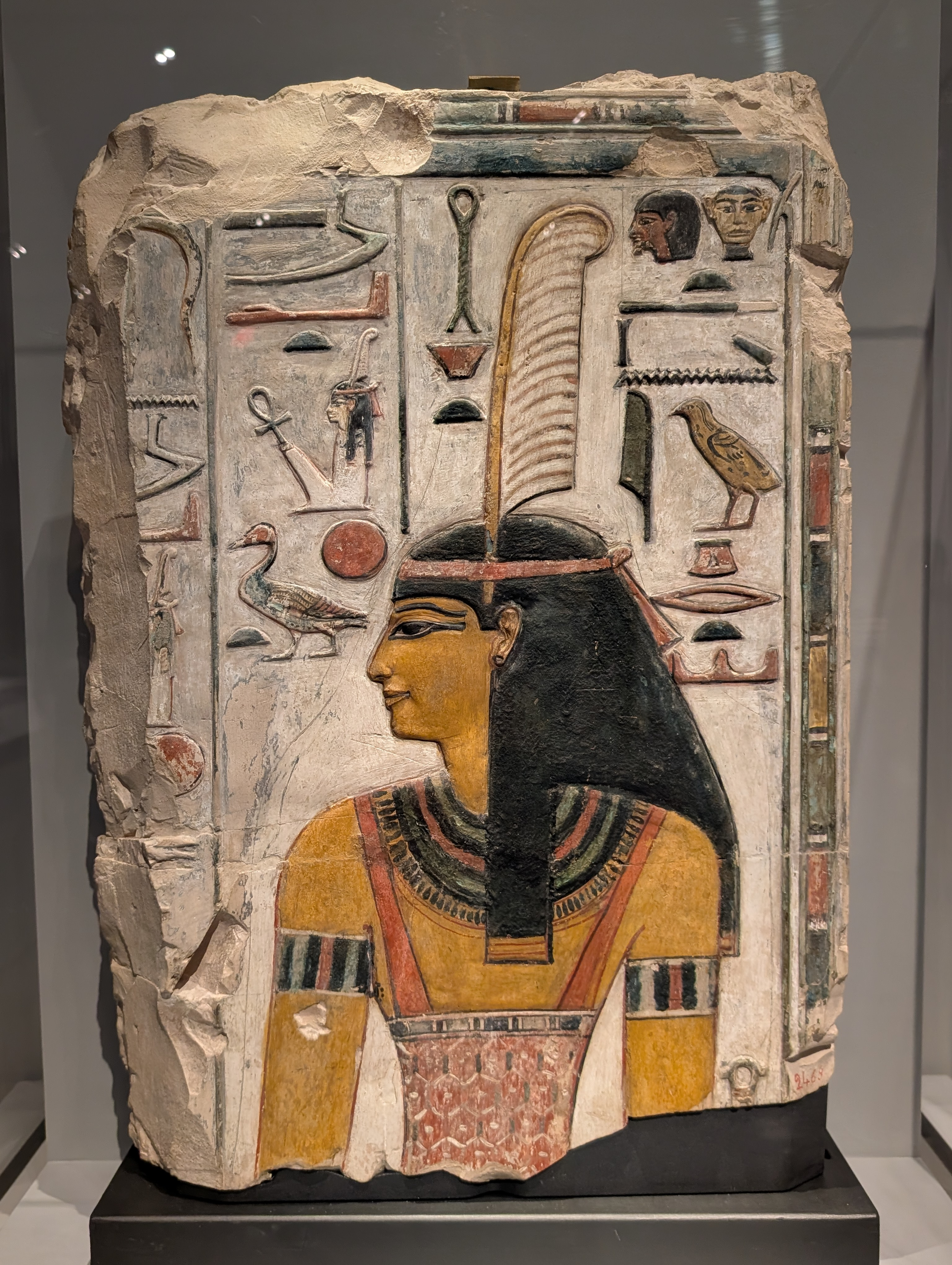
- Relief of Maat (KV17), on display at the Metropolitan Museum of Art's Divine Egypt exhibit, December 2025
- Material: Limestone, Polychromy
- Height: 74 cm (29 in)
- Width: 47 cm (19 in)
- Writing: Egyptian hieroglyphs
- Created: 19th Dynasty of Egypt, reign of Seti I, (1290–1279 BC)
- Period/culture: 19th Dynasty
- Discovered: KV17, Valley of the Kings
- Discovered by: Giovanni Belzoni (1821), Franco-Toscan Expedition (1828–1829), Ippolito Rosellini (1829)
- Present location: National Archaeological Museum, Florence, Italy
- Identification: 2469
- Culture: Ancient Egypt

The Relief of Maat, or Maat of Florence, is a fragmented low-relief tomb painting of the Egyptian goddess of justice, Maat. Dating to the Nineteenth Dynasty of Egypt, during the reign of Seti I (1289–1279 BC), it was discovered in the Tomb of Seti I (KV17) in the Valley of the Kings by pioneering Egyptologist Giovanni Belzoni in 1817. An iconic image of the goddess, it was crudely extracted from the walls of the tomb, and has been part of the collection of the National Archaeological Museum, Florence, where it is catalogued under inv. 2469.

== Description ==
Maat's appearances in texts and tomb relief of the pharaoh can be dated as far back as the Fourth Dynasty of Egypt, where pharaohs presented themselves as "possessors of Maat", as described by Sneferu, or that they "shine in Maat" under Amenhotep III, in accordance with extant funerary texts like the Pyramid Texts. The evolution of Maat's prominent form, with feather on her head, or sometimes depicted with wings, evolved throughout the duration of the New Kingdom. Even then, her divine imagery somewhat blended or merged with contemporary depictions of Isis or Hathor at the time.

The Relief of Maat, measuring 74 × 47 cm, is considered a vividly polychromed painting, attesting to the preservation of KV17, which was discovered by Giovanni Belzoni on 16 October 1817, to which he described the reliefs looking fresh with the artists' tools remaining on the floor. Years later, in 1828–1829, the Franco-Toscan expedition, which further explored the tomb, removed the relief from the walls, and transported it to the National Archaeological Museum in Florence, Italy, under a purchase by Ippolito Rosellini.

Catalogued under Museum 2469, Rosselini in 1830 in his description catalogued the relief:

Beautiful bas-relief painted on limestone. It represents the goddess who, under the dual and promiscuous names of Justice and Truth, presided over Amenti, the formidable tribunal of the afterlife. The inscription around it reads: Tme (Truth and Justice) Goddess, daughter of the sun, ruler and center of the world, resident in the land of Kel (Amenti).

The text remaining on the relief "MAat zA Ra Hnwt.. Hry-tp tA n iwgrt Dd mdw [i]n MAat [sA Ra] " translates to "Maat, daughter of Ra, lady of...rules the land of silence (the necropolis).Words said by Maat, daughter of Ra..."

Maat is further described by Ernesto Schiaparelli as depicted in a tight-fitting dress, held by two straps, wearing a large necklace, distinguished by the large ostrich feather, which links with aerial deities given her relationship as daughter of Ra, further augmented with yellow skin, which symbolizes light. It is however noted, that the Egyptian goddesses within KV17 are primarily distinguished by what is on their head, because otherwise they would be depicted as identical in body, shape, and dress.

In the painting's original context, Maat is depicted with the goddesses Nekhbet and Wadjet in the form of cobras, and in doorways, she is sometimes seen interchangeably depicted with Hathor.

The prominence of the goddesses in the pantheon depicted in KV17, and her evolving recognition at the time, further depicts the importance of women in Egyptian society, as well as maternal importance in the mythology.

== Cultural references ==
The Relief of Maat is depicted in stained glass form at the Yale Law School, in New Haven, Connecticut, in the Ruttenberg Dining Hall (installed in 1930), where the relief is seen alongside depictions of Confucius, the trial of Socrates, and Prince Shōtoku, along with various figures and deities from around the world.
