= Museums of Florence =

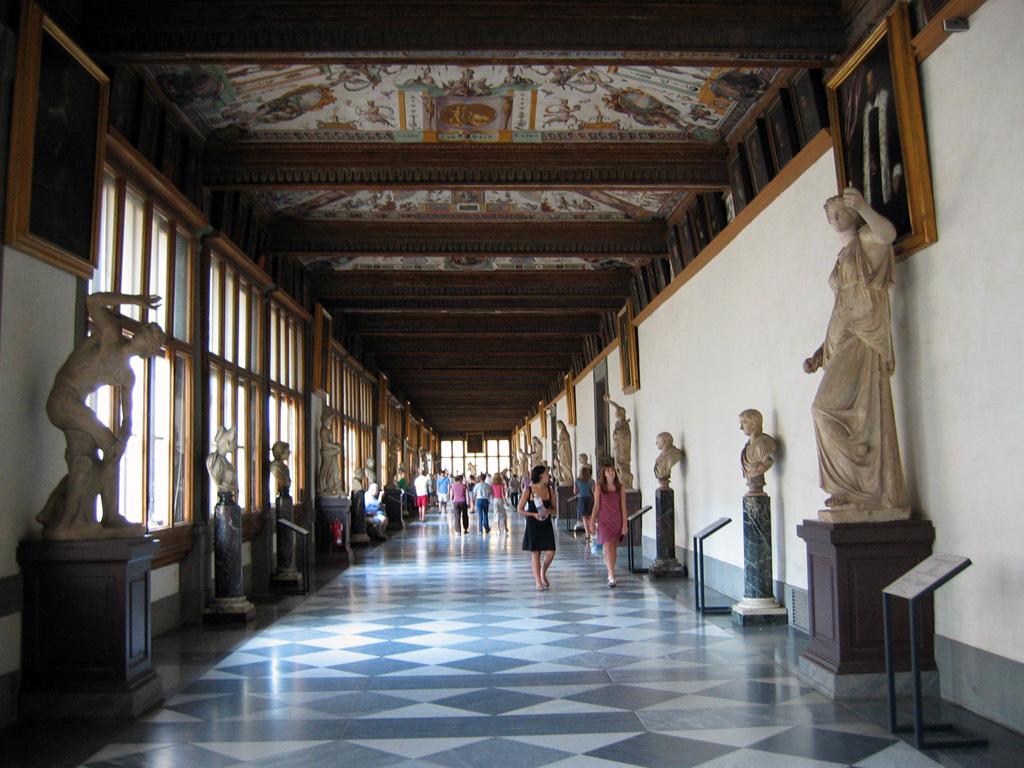
A corridor at the Uffizi galleries

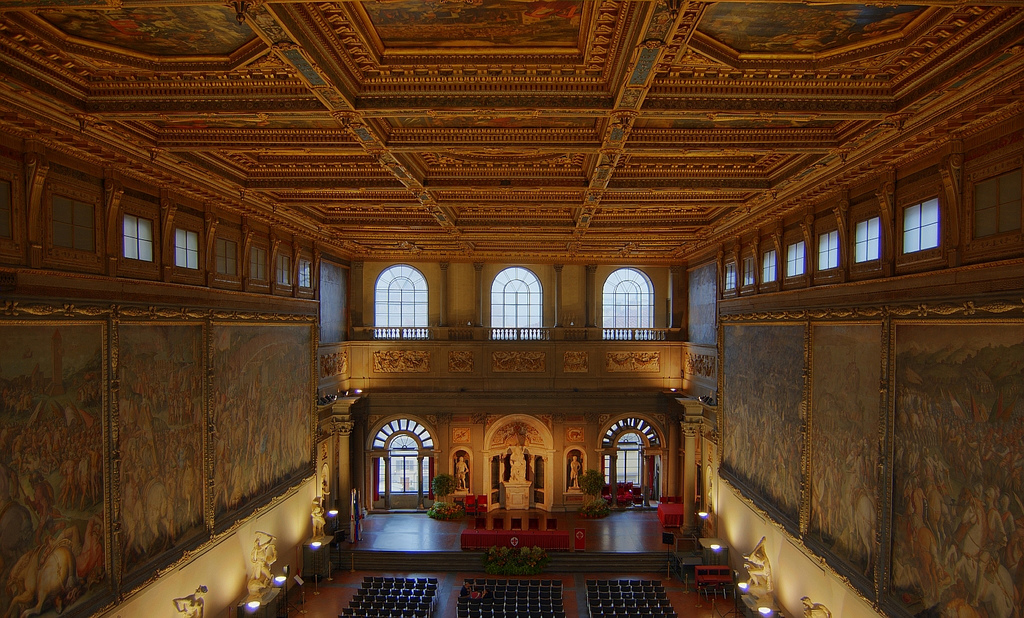
A salon at the Palazzo Vecchio

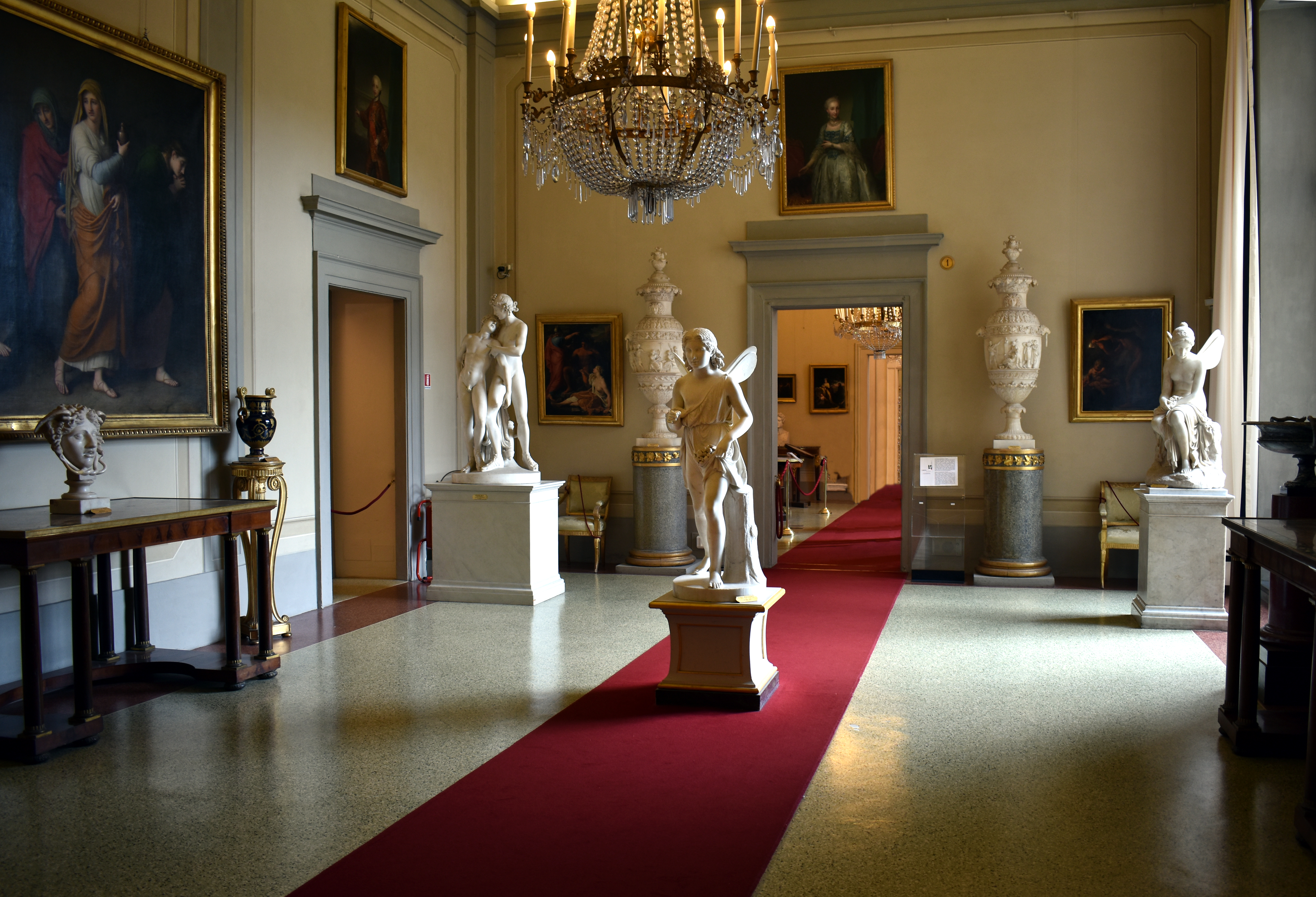
Gallery of Modern Art

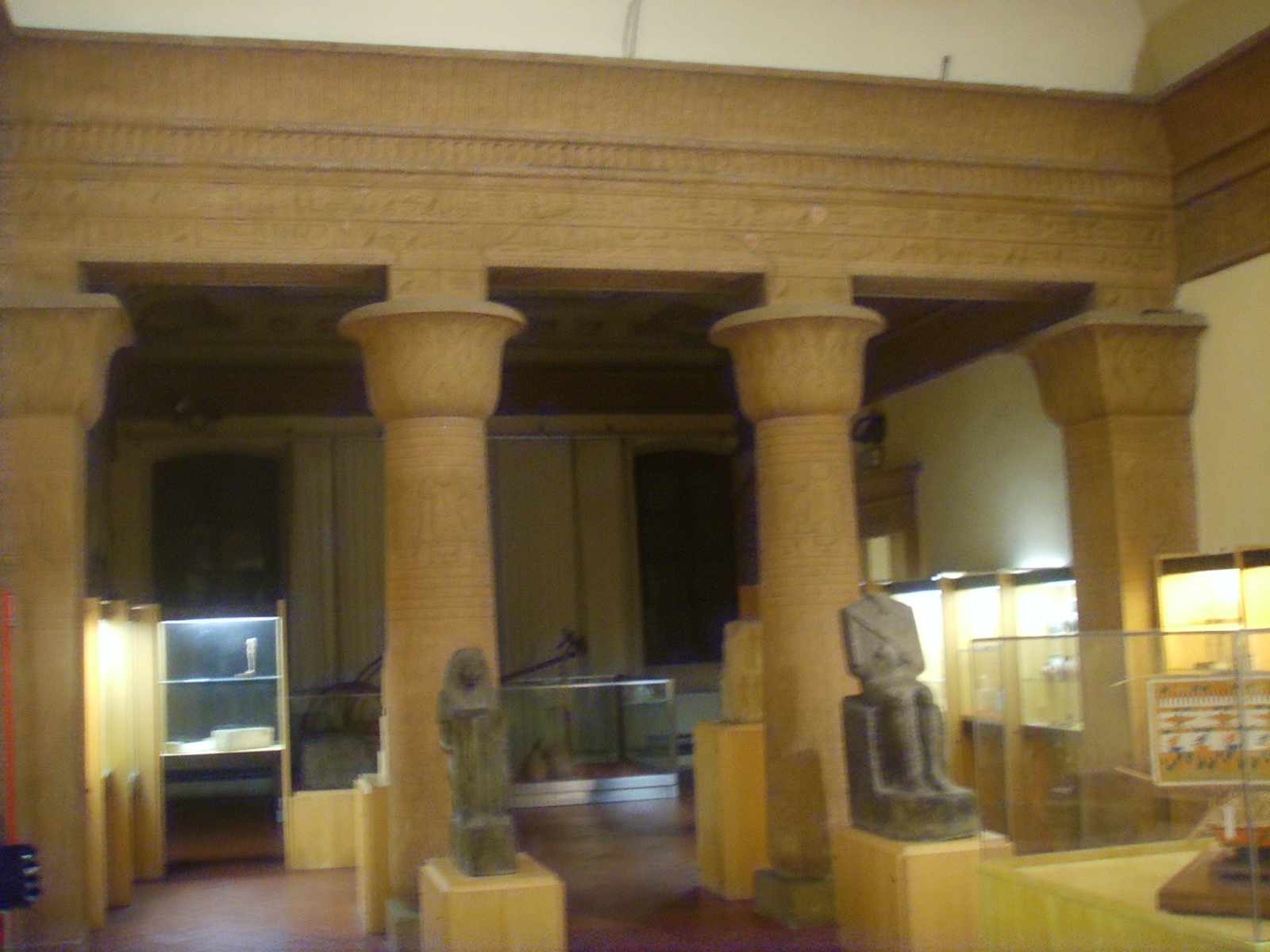
National Archaeological Museum of Florence

The Museums of Florence form a key element of the cultural and artistic character of the city. Of the 15 most visited Italian art museums and galleries, five are in Florence. The number and proximity of the works of art in the museums of Florence can trigger Stendhal syndrome on visitors who try to see them all, as evidenced by hospital records of hundreds of visitors each year affected by the syndrome. The art in Florence was one of the elements that contributed to the central part of the city being named a UNESCO World Heritage Site.

The art in Florence is inherently linked to the Medici family, who collected considerable holdings of paintings, sculptures, furnishings and art objects. Unlike other cities, the Florence collections are the property of the city, thanks to Anna Maria Luisa de Medici (died 1743, the last of the Florentine Medicis) who bequeathed all the family collections to the city as long as they remained united. A second issue is that unlike other major cities, Florence was not sacked, and hence did not undergo the looting experienced by cities such as Mantua, Modena, and Parma. And with the unification of Italy the Savoys moved a series of furnishings and works from other disused Italian palaces to their residence in Palazzo Pitti and the Medici villas. The protection continued even during the Second World War, and on 3 September 1944, when the Germans bombed every bridge in Florence (except Ponte Vecchio) in the Operazione Feurzauber, the museums were not attacked. Today, most of the city's art collections are managed by the state.

== Museums ==
The Uffizi Gallery holds figurative art up to about the middle of the eighteenth century, with an overlap from the late fifteenth century with the works preserved in the Palatine Gallery of Palazzo Pitti. The Uffizi also holds classical sculptures, which supplement the ancient art in the National Archaeological Museum. Renaissance and Mannerist sculptures are generally held at the Bargello National Museum. The Gallery of Modern Art holds items from the neoclassical period to the first half of the twentieth century. The National Archaeological Museum holds items including Egyptian, Etruscan and Roman artifacts.

The Uffizi Gallery has a collection of Florentine Renaissance art divided into various rooms set up by style and in chronological order. Born from the artistic collections accumulated over the centuries by the Medici, it also has a collection of ancient sculptures and exhibits such as works by Giotto, Leonardo da Vinci, Michelangelo, Raphael, Titian, Caravaggio, and many others.

The Galleria dell'Accademia is known for the collection of Michelangelo statues, including his David. It is a multipurpose museum, composed of several elements, including early Tuscan paintings, the sculptures of Michelangelo and contemporary paintings, and other nineteenth-century sculptures, as well as a collection of Russian icons. The gallery also includes the "Museum of Musical Instruments".

The Palazzo Pitti, south of the Arno River, was the chief residence of the Medici family in the 16th century, and holds a number of the works of arts they had purchased or commissioned. It is a building complex that includes a number of galleries, including the "Gallery of Modern Art", the Porcelain Museum and the "Carriages Museum". Its principal gallery, the Palatine Gallery holds works of art mostly from the Renaissance.

== See also ==
- House of Medici
- List of museums in Italy
