= Paola Pruneti =

Italian papyrologist and palaeographer (born 1937)

Paola Pruneti (born June 26, 1937, in Florence), Italian papyrologist and palaeographer. Pruneti worked at the University of Florence.

She is a member of the Editor Committee of Analecta Papyrologica, a journal edited by the Department of Philology and Linguistic of the University of Messina.

Pruneti examined and edited text of Uncial 0277 and many other ancient and mediaeval manuscripts.

== Works ==
- I Kleroi del nòmo Ossirinchite. (In"Aegyptus" LV /1975, pp. 159 – 244).
- I centri abitati dell'Ossirinchite. (= Papyrologica Florentina IX), Firenze 1981.
- Toparchie e Pagoi: precisazioni topografiche relative al nòmo Ossirinchite (In "Aegyptus" LXIX /1989, pp. 113 – 118).
- Ancora su Toparchie e Pagoi dell’Ossirinchite. Addenda (In "Aegyptus" LXXXI [2001, ma uscito nel 2004], pp. 291–297).
- Papiri della Società Italiana. Lista delle riedizioni dei testi documentari (In "Miscellanea Papyrologica in occasione del bicentenario della Charta Borgiana", Firenze 1990, pp. 475–502).
- Trasferimenti contabili di grano. Testimonianze e formularî (In "Analecta Papyrologica" VI /1994), pp. 53–91).
