= National Archaeological Museum, Florence =

Archaeological museum of Florence, Italy

National Archaeological Museum of Florence
- Museo archeologico nazionale di Firenze
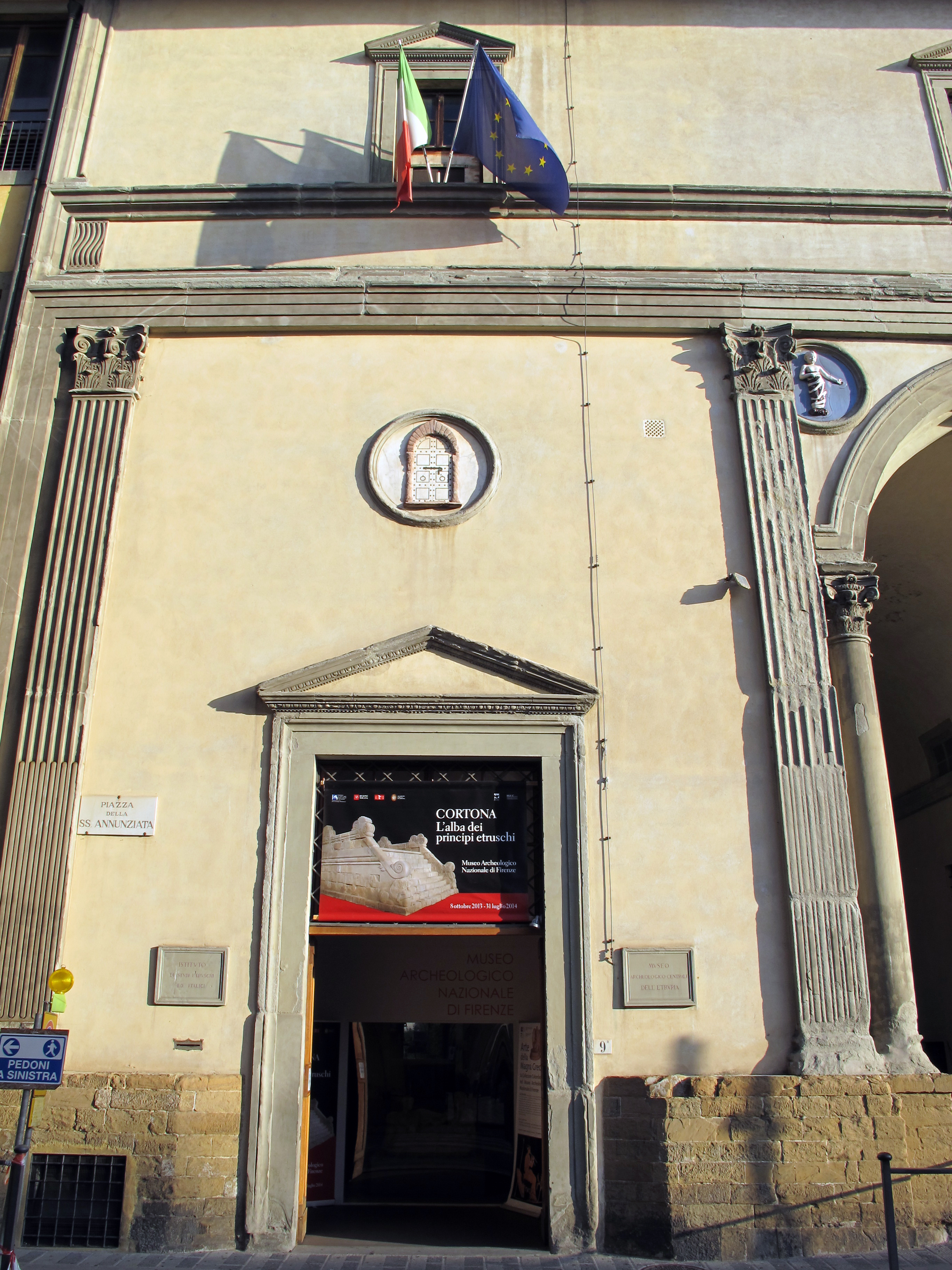
- Location: Piazza Santissima Annunziata 9 B, Florence, Tuscany, Italy
- Coordinates: 43°46′34.46″N 11°15′44.16″E
- Type: Archaeology
- Website: Official website

The National Archaeological Museum of Florence (Italian: Museo archeologico nazionale di Firenze) is an archaeological museum in Florence, Italy. It is located at 1 piazza Santissima Annunziata, in the Palazzo della Crocetta, a palace built in 1620 by Giulio Parigi for princess Maria Maddalena, daughter of Ferdinand I de Medici.

== History ==
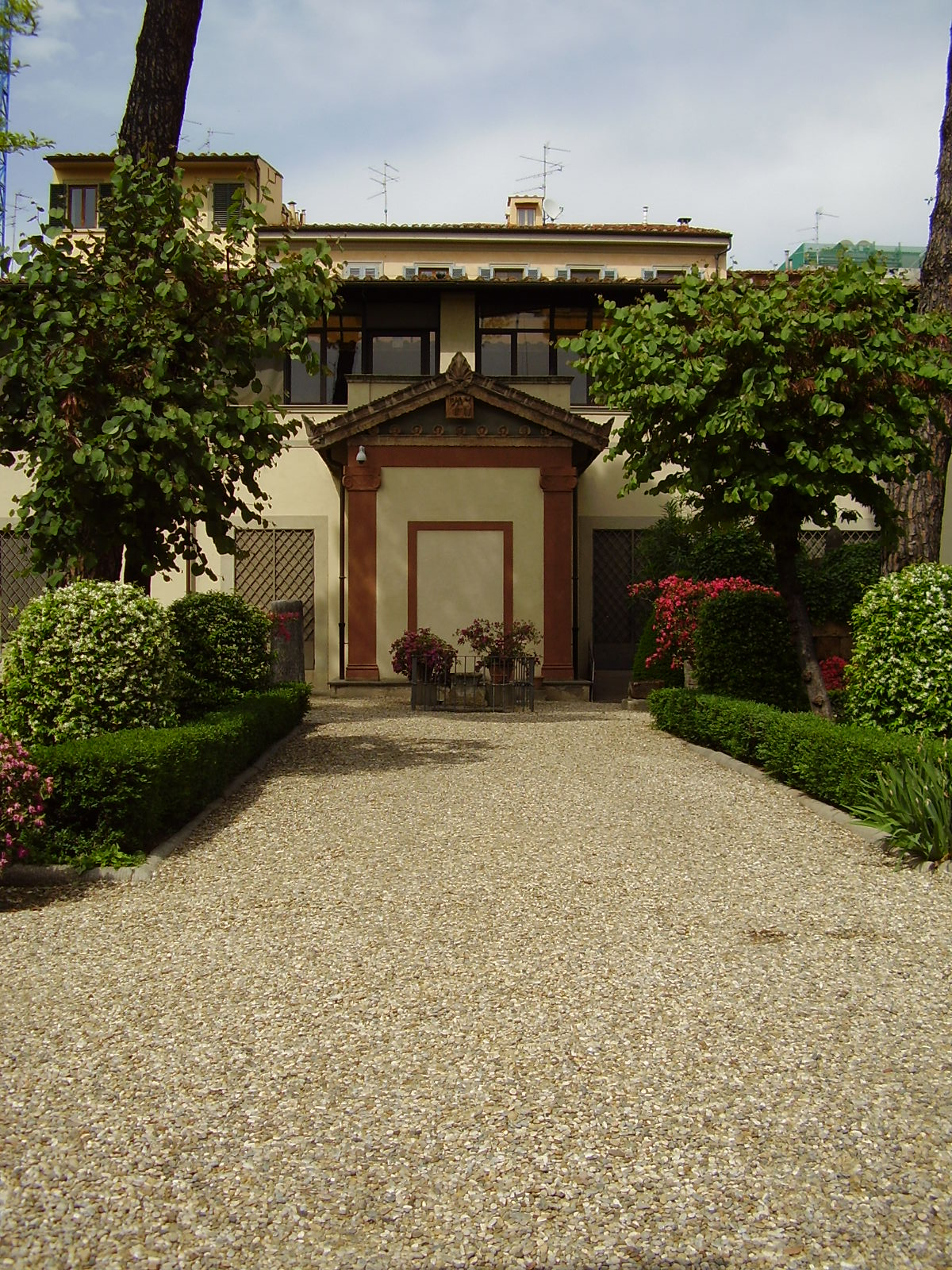
An Etruscan pavilion at the National Archaeological Museum

The museum was inaugurated in the presence of King Victor Emmanuel II in 1870 in the buildings of the Cenacolo di Fuligno on via Faenza. At that time it only comprised Etruscan and Roman remains. As the collections grew, a new site soon became necessary and in 1880 the museum was transferred to its present building.

The collection's first foundations were the family collections of the Medici and Lorraine, with several transfers from the Uffizi up to 1890 (except the collections of marble sculpture which the Uffizi already possessed). The Egyptian section was first formed in the first half of the 18th century from part of the collections of Leopold II, from another part of an expedition promoted by the same grand duke in 1828–29 and led by Ippolito Rosellini and Champollion (the man who first deciphered hieroglyphics). In 1887 a new topographic museum on the Etruscans was added, but it was destroyed in the 1966 floods.

== Etruscan collections ==
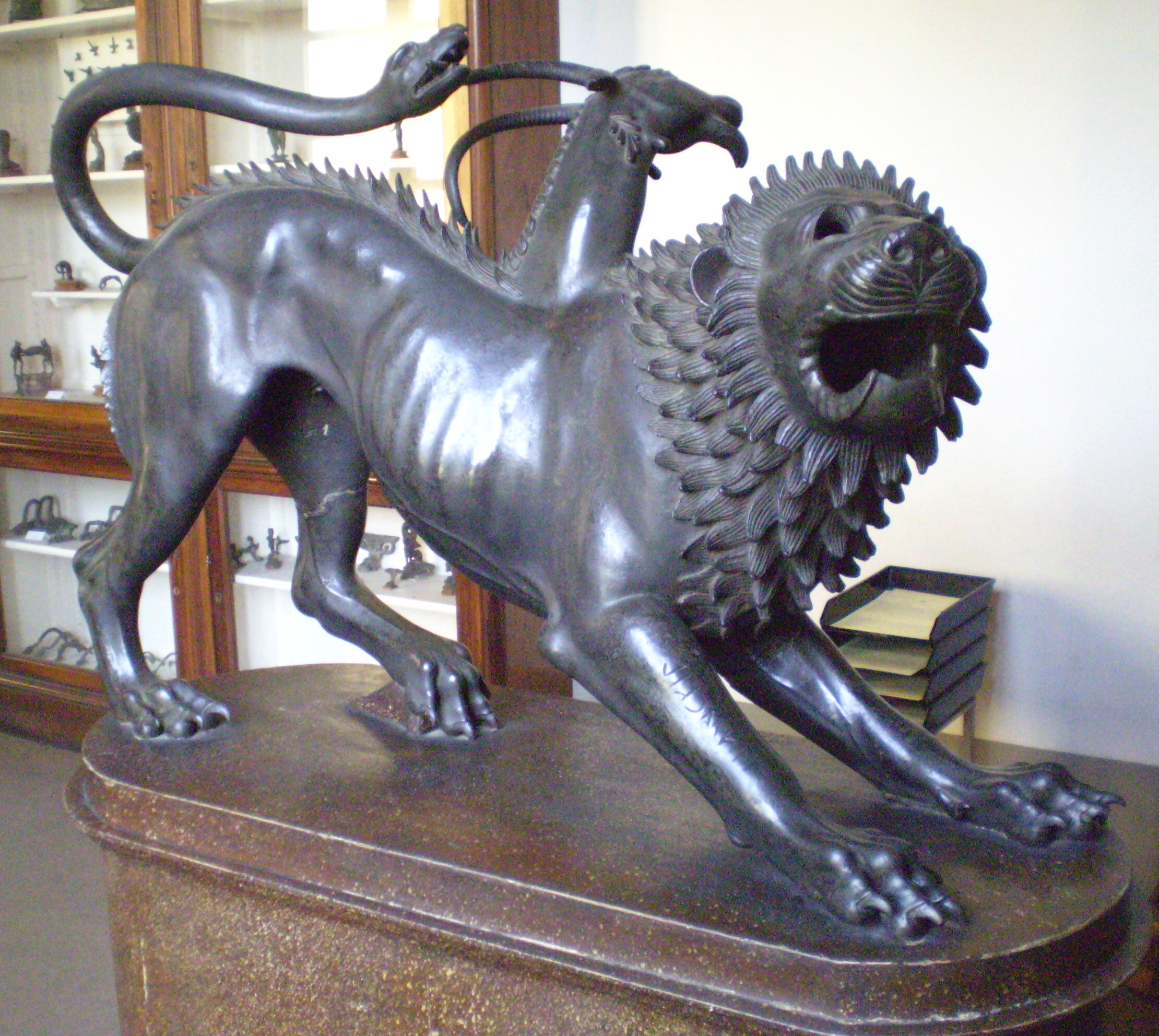
Chimera of Arezzo

The organisation of the Etruscan rooms was reconsidered and reordered in 2006. Also in 2006, the 40-year-overdue restoration was carried out on over 2000 objects damaged in the 1966 floods.

- The Chimera of Arezzo – discovered in 1553 at Arezzo during the construction of a Medici fortress
- The statue of the Arringatore ("The Orator"), a life-size bronze sculpture of an Etruscan man wearing a toga (1st century BC)
- The funerary statue Mater Matuta (460–450 BC) (returned to Chianciano Terme)
- The sarcophagus of Laerthia Seianti (2nd century BC)
- The sarcophagus of the Amazons (4th century BC)

== Roman collections ==
- The "idolino of Pesaro", a 146-cm-high bronze statue of a young man, a Roman copy from a classical Greek original, found in fragments in the centre of Pesaro in October 1530.
- The "torso di Livorno", copy of a 5th-century BC Greek original.
- Statue of a cockerel, the so-called "Gallo Treboniano", late 3rd-century work.
- The Minerva of Arezzo, a bronze Roman copy of a 4th-century BC Greek model attributed to Praxiteles.

== Greek collections ==
The huge collection of ancient ceramics is shown in a large room with numerous cases on the second floor. Generally the vases come from Etruscan tombs and are evidence of cultural and mercantile exchange with Greece, and particularly Athens (where most of the vases were made) and date to the period between the 4th century BC and the present.

The most important of the vases is a large black figure krater of c. 570 BC signed by the potter Ergotimos and the painter Kleitias. It is named the François vase after the archaeologist who found it in 1844 in an Etruscan tomb at fonte Rotella, on the Chiusi road, and shows a series of Greek mythological narratives on both sides. Other notable objects are:

- the red figure hydria signed by the Meidias painter (550–540 BC)
- the cups by the Little Masters (560–540 BC), named after their miniaturist style of their figures
- the sculptures of Apollo and Apollino Milani (6th century BC, named after the man who gave them to the museum)
- the athlete's torso (5th century BC)
- the large Hellenistic horse's head (known as the Medici Riccardi head after the first place it was displayed, in the Palazzo Medici Riccardi), fragment of an equestrian statue, which inspired Donatello and Verrocchio in two famous equestrian monuments in Padua and Venice.
- two Archaic marble kouroi, displayed in a corridor
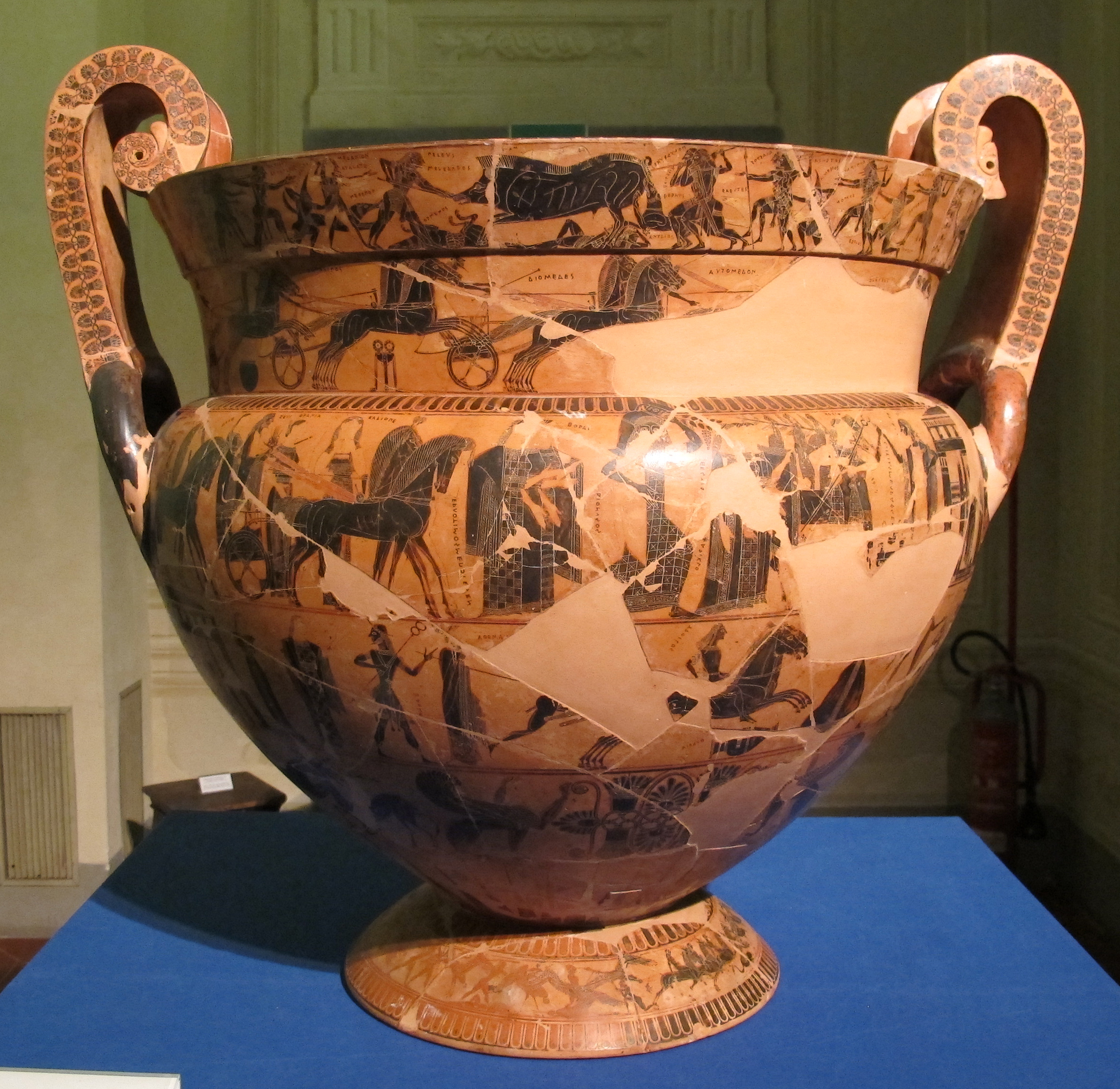
The François Vase

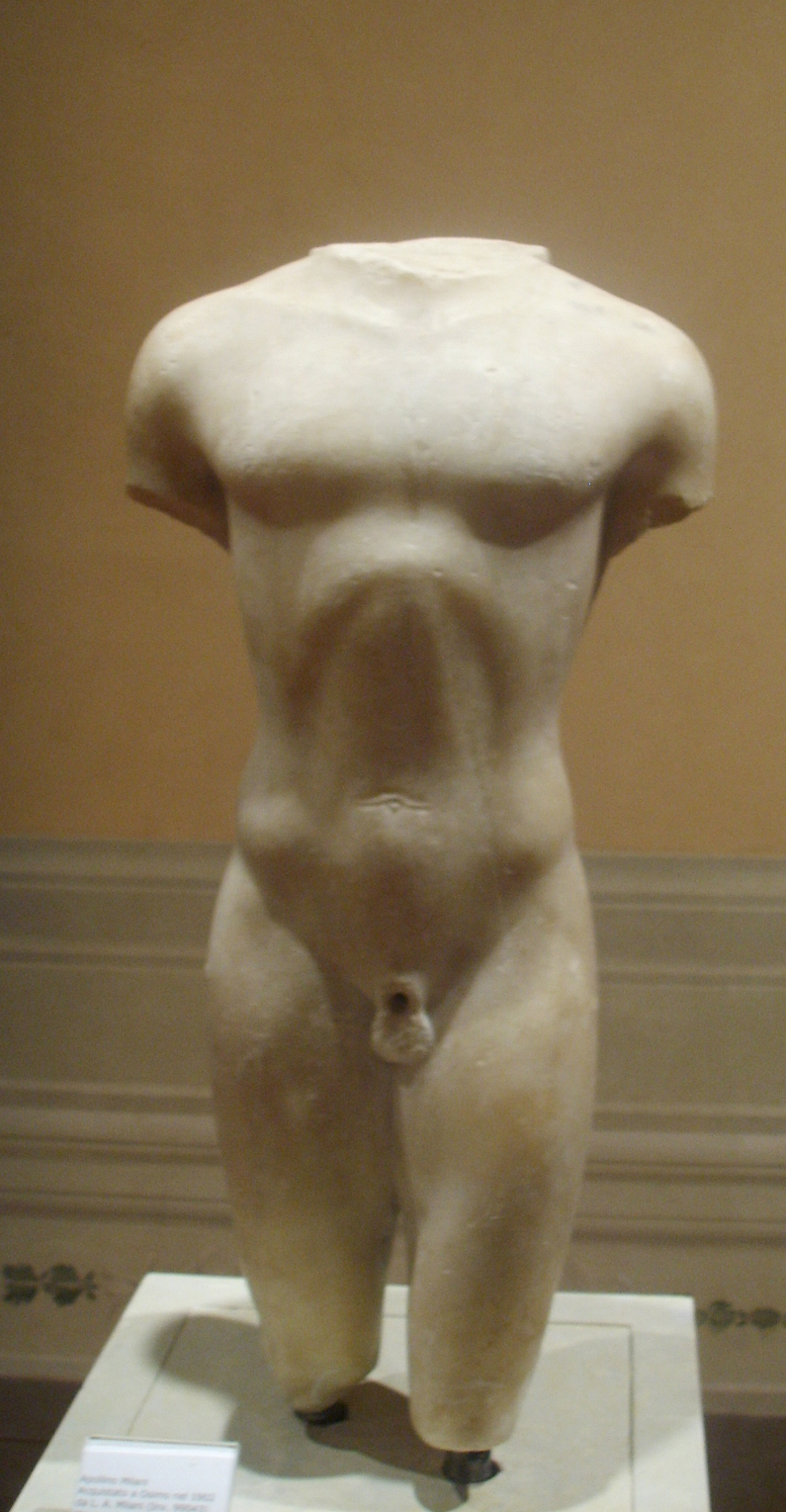
The Apollino Milani

== Egyptian Museum ==
The Egyptian section of the collection is known as the Egyptian Museum, and is the second largest collection of Egyptian artefacts in Italy, after that of the Museo Egizio in Turin.

=== Foundation ===
Florence's first collection of Egyptian antiquities was in the Medici collection, dating from the eighteenth century. In the nineteenth century, Leopold II, Grand Duke of Tuscany, began acquisition of the artefacts now housed at the Egyptian Museum. Together with Charles X of France, he financed a scientific expedition to Egypt in 1828 to 1829. The expedition was directed by Jean-François Champollion, who deciphered the hieroglyphic script. Ippolito Rosellini, friend and student of Champollion, represented the Italian interests during the expedition. He went on to become the father of Italian Egyptology. Many artefacts were collected during the expedition, both from archaeological diggings, and via purchases from local merchants. On their return, these were distributed evenly between the Louvre in Paris, and the new Egyptian Museum in Florence.

=== Development ===
The museum was officially opened in 1855. The first director was Ernesto Schiaparelli, from Piedmont. He later went on to become director of the larger Egyptian museum in Turin. By 1880 he had catalogued the collection and organised transportation of the antiquities to the Florentine Archaeological Museum. Under Schiaparelli, the collection expanded with further excavations and purchases carried out in Egypt. Many of the artefacts were, however, later transferred to Turin.

The Florentine collection continued to grow after this time, with donations from private individuals and scientific institutions. In particular, the Papyrological Institute of Florence provided artefacts from its expeditions to Egypt between 1934 and 1939. These now provide one of the most substantial collections of Coptic art and documents in the world.

=== The Egyptian Museum today ===
The museum now has a permanent staff including two professional Egyptologists. It houses more than 14,000 artefacts, distributed in nine galleries and two warehouses. The artefacts displayed in the galleries have been substantially restored. The old classification system devised by Schiaparelli is being replaced by a new, chronological and partly topographical system.

The collection comprises material that extends from the prehistorical era right through to the Coptic Age. There are remarkable collections of stele, mummies, ushabti, amulets, and bronze statuettes of several eras. There are statues from the reign of Amenhotep III, a chariot from the eighteenth dynasty, a pillar from the tomb of Seti I, parts of the burial equipment of Tjesraperet, who was a wet nurse of King Taharqo, a New Testament papyrus (𝔓^{2}, 𝔓^{65}) and many other distinctive artefacts from many periods.

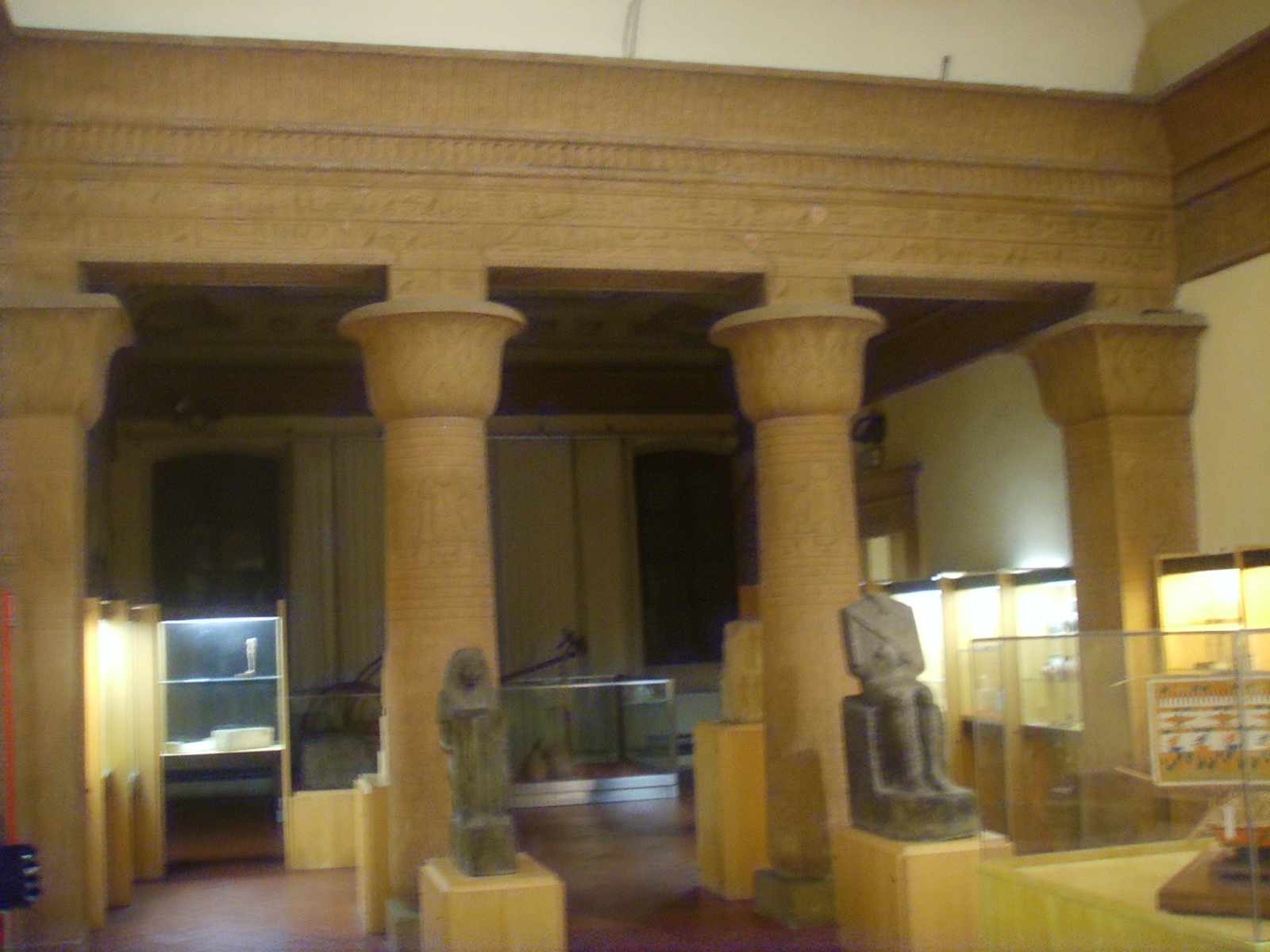
Gallery in the Egyptian collection

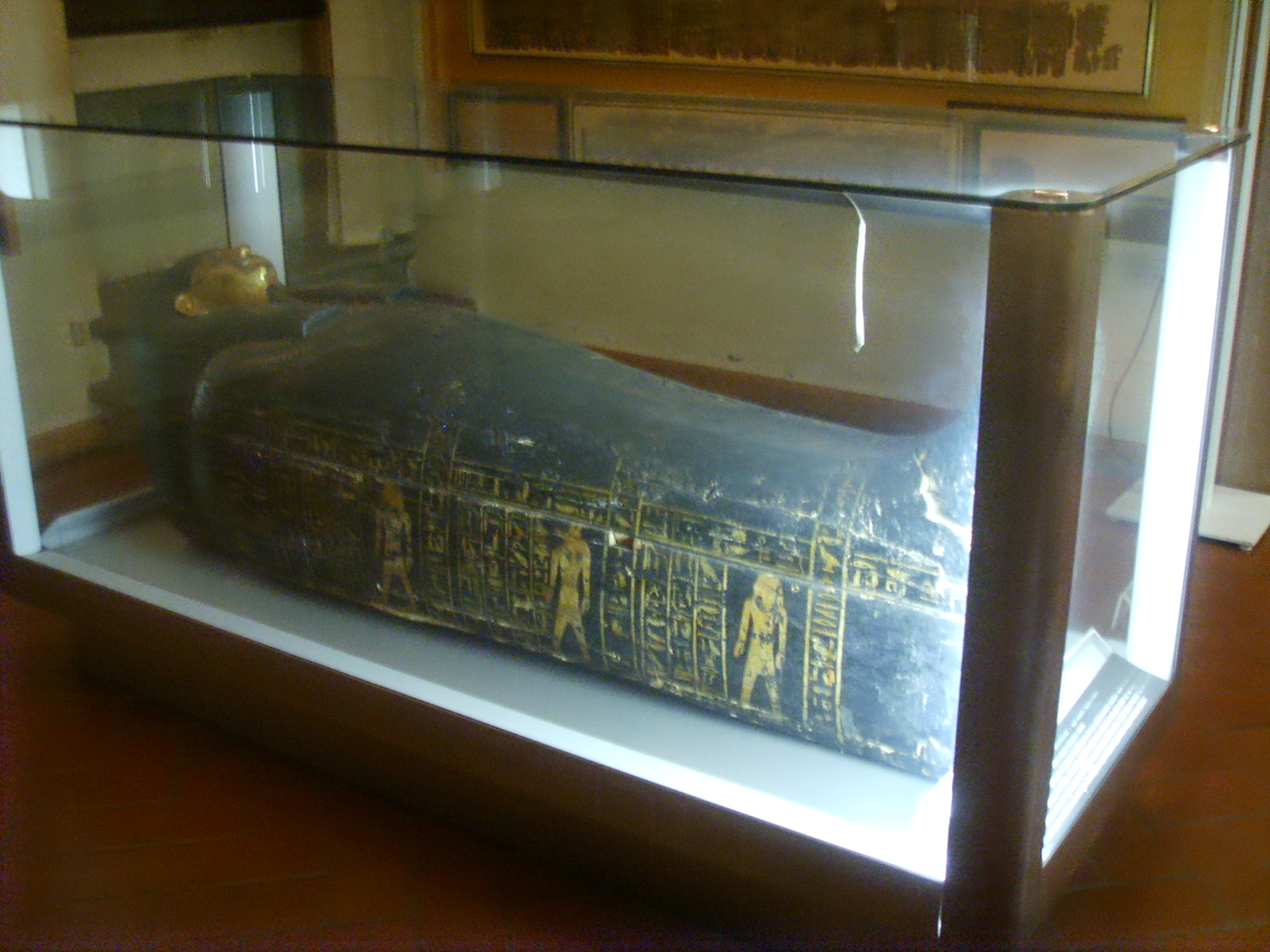
Royal sarcophagus

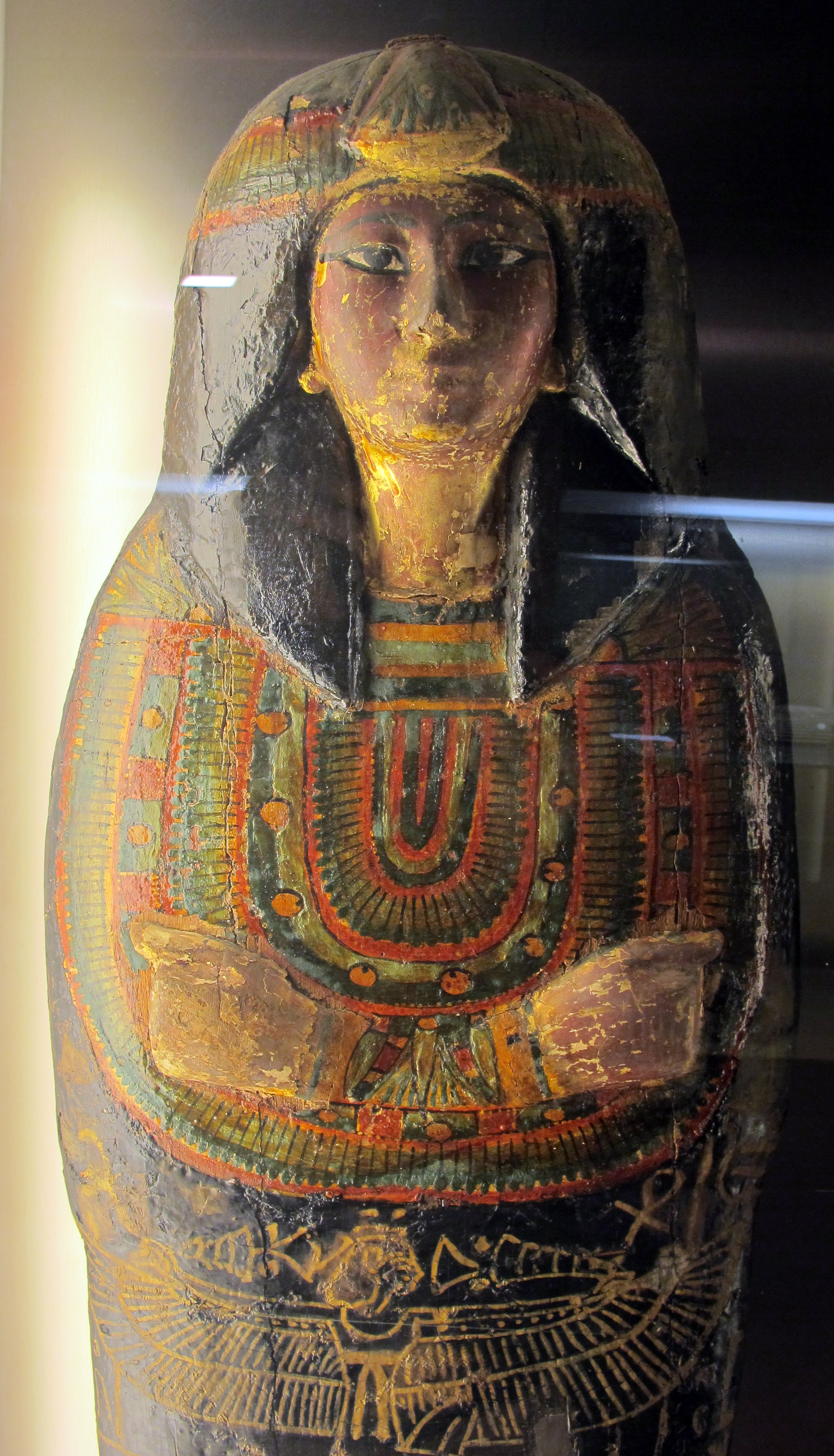
Woman's sarcophagus

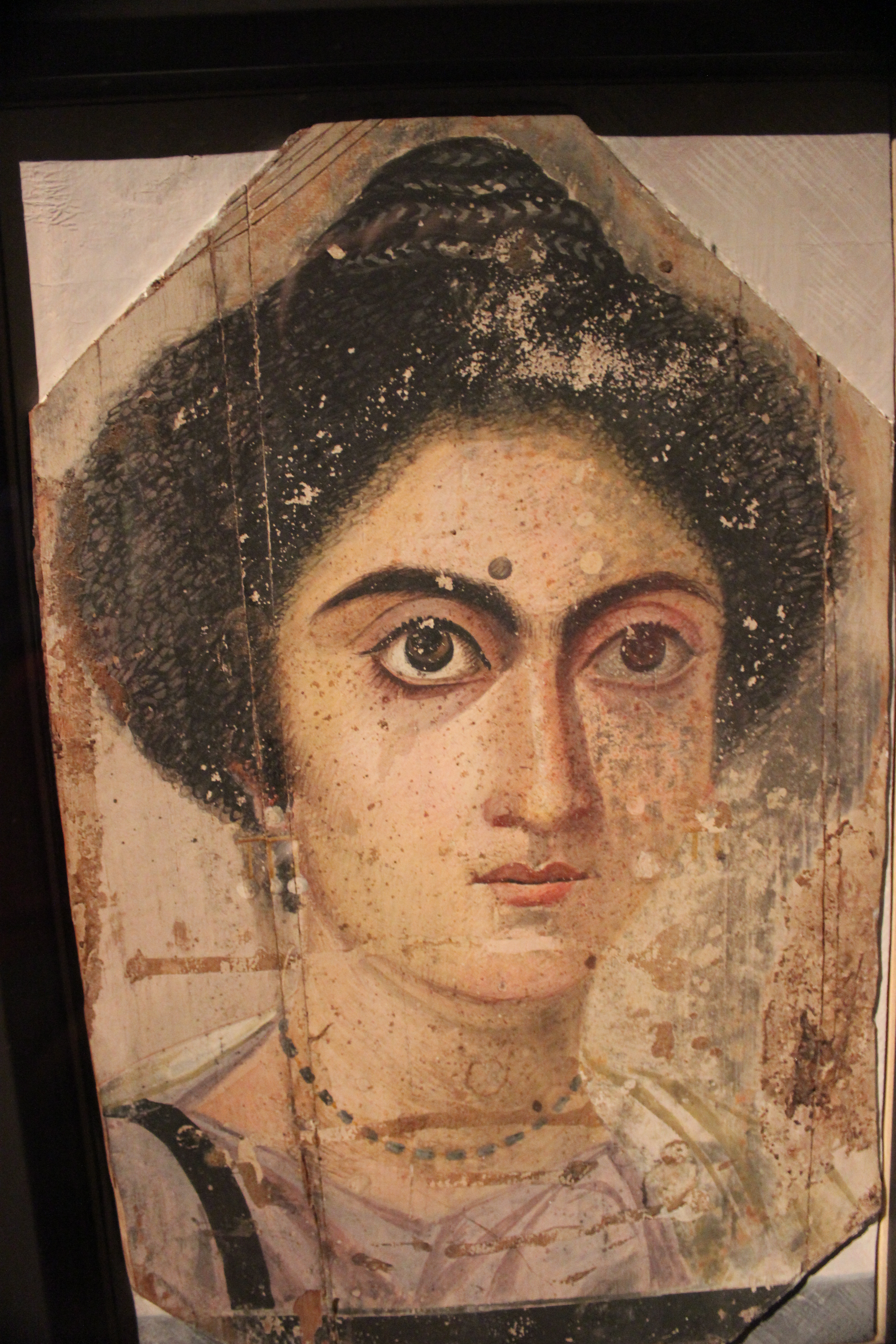
Portrait from Al Fayyum

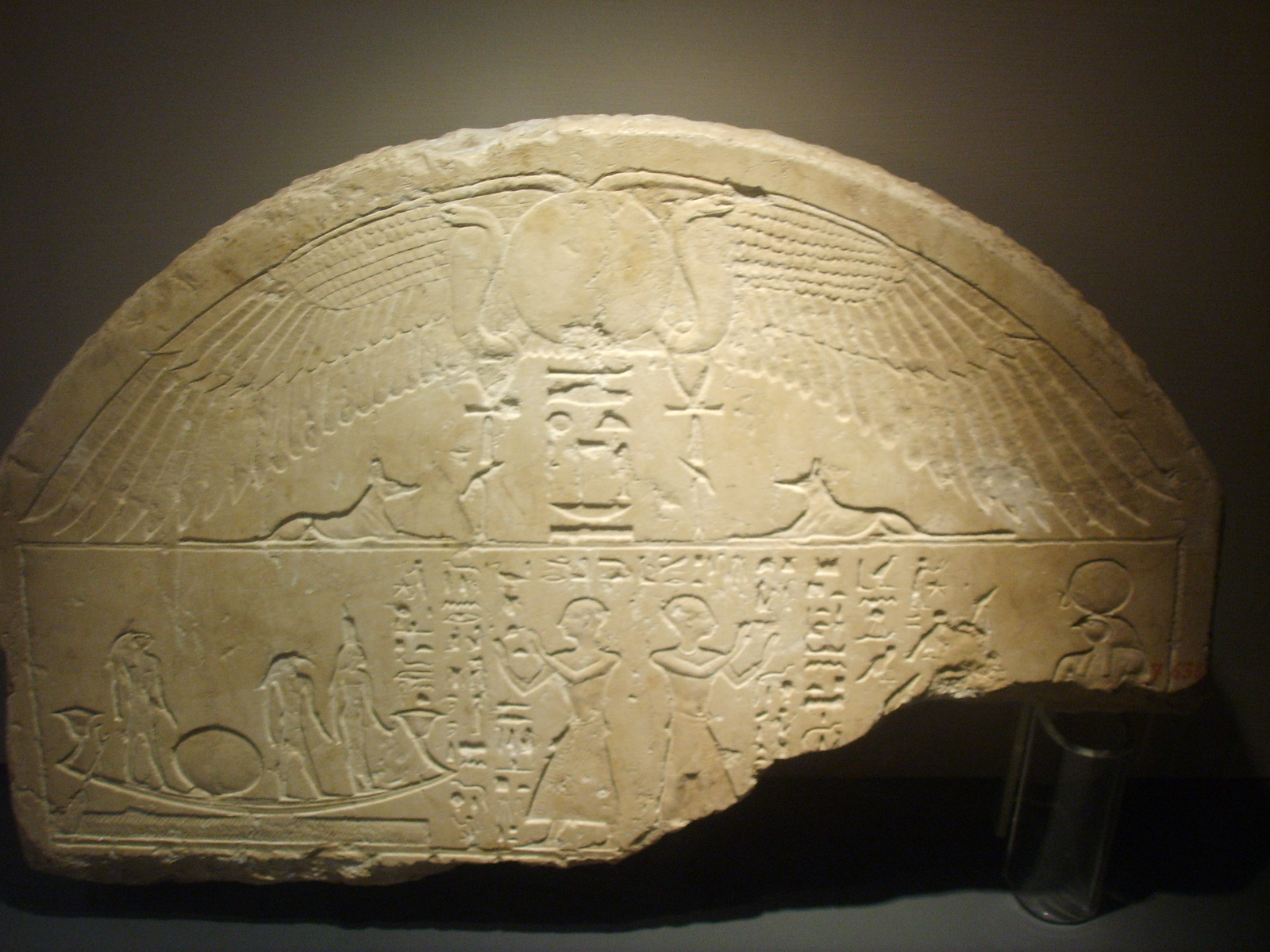
Ptolemaic sacred stele

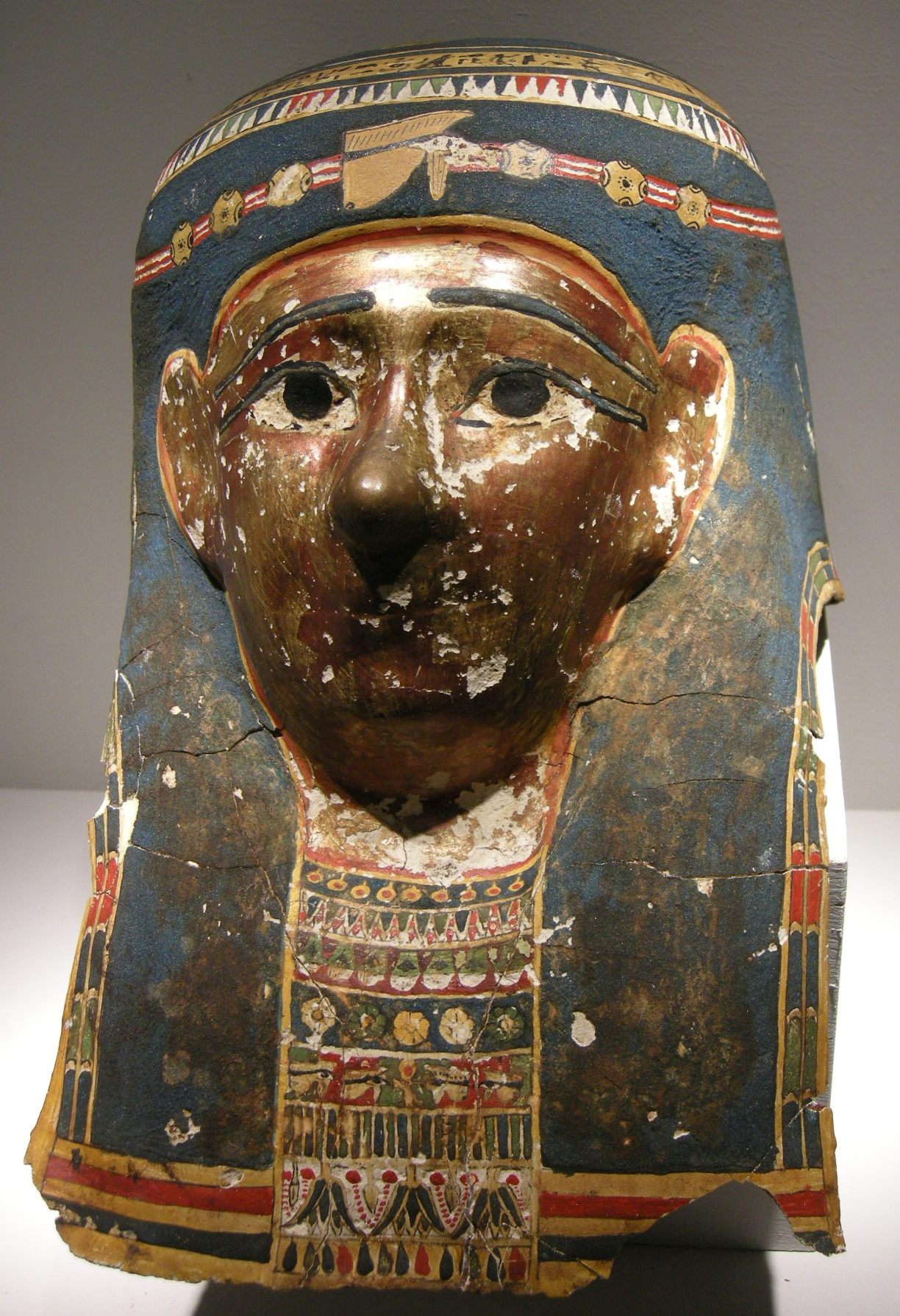
Egyptian funerary mask

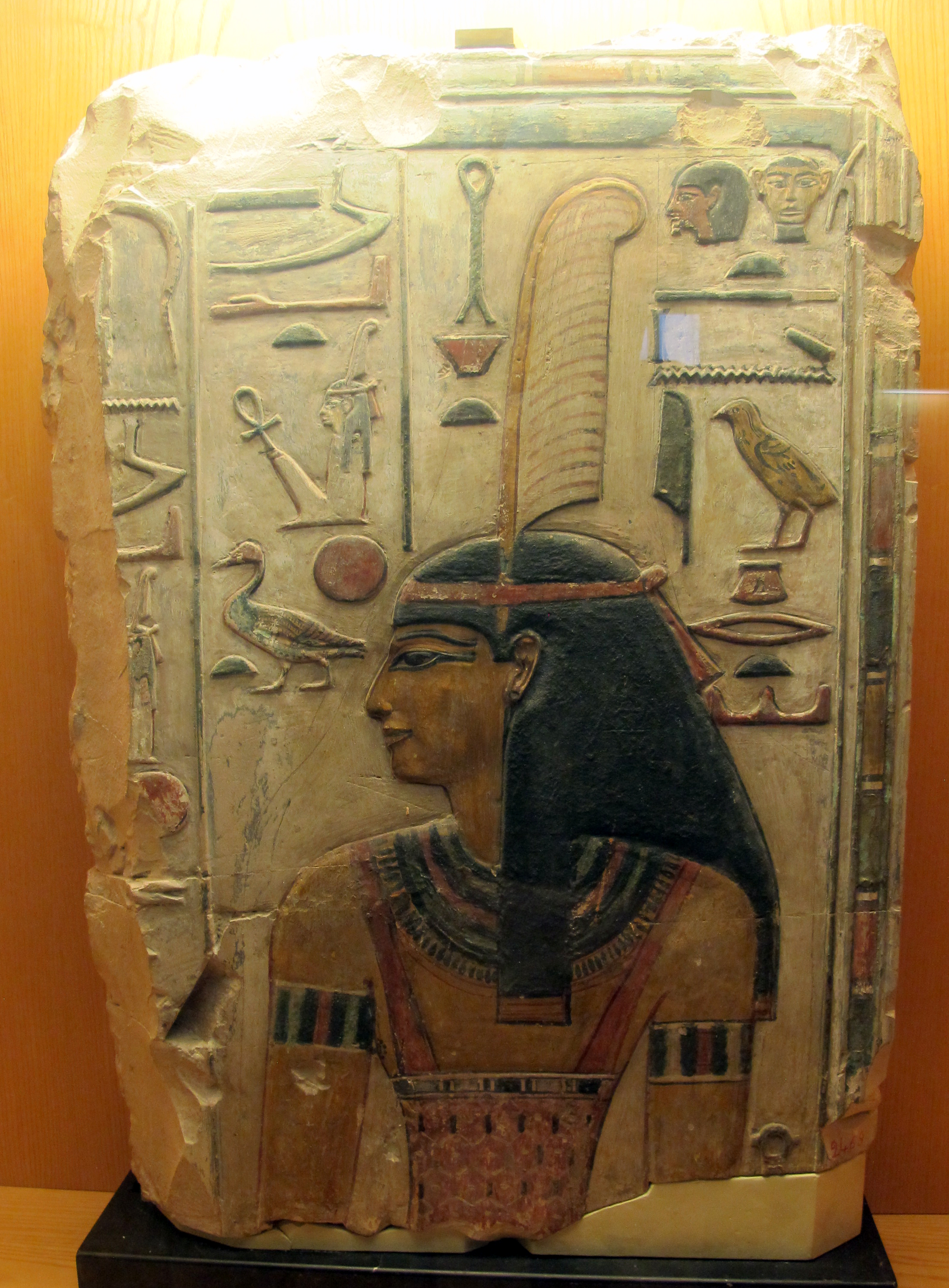
Relief of Maat

== Separate section ==
A separate section of the museum is in the baroque Villa Corsini a Castello, nearby Florence, mostly dedicated to Ancient Roman and Etruscan sculpture.

== See also ==
- Cartonnage
- List of New Testament papyri
- Museums of Florence
- The Tribuna of the Uffizi painting by Johan Zoffany containing several works of the museum's collection
