= Judgement (afterlife) =

Judgement of the dead in the afterlife

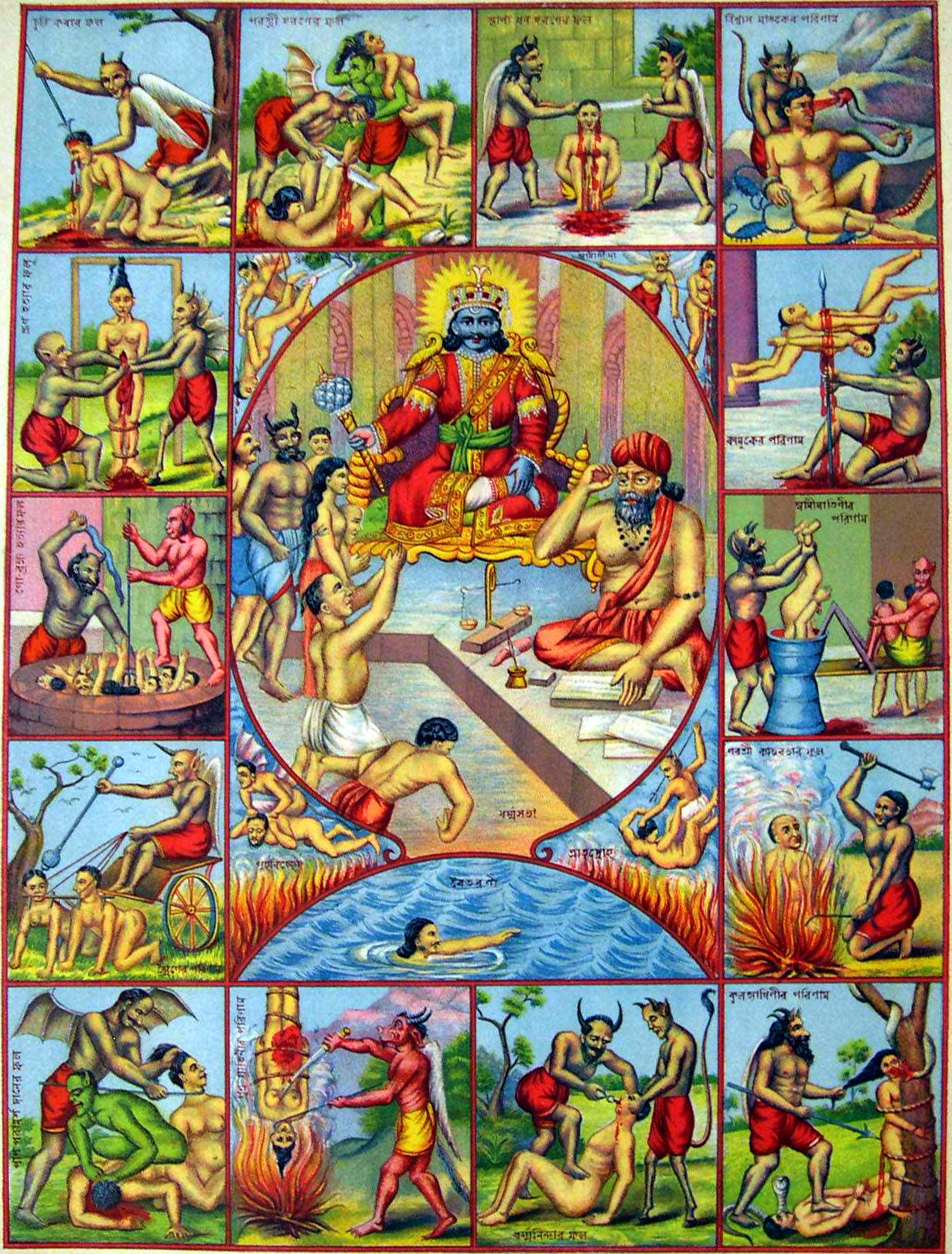
The central panel portrays the Hindu god Yama judges the dead. Other panels depict various realms/hells of Naraka.

Judgement in an afterlife, in which one's deeds and characteristics in life determine either punishment or reward, is a central theme of many religions. Almost all religions are greatly devoted to the afterlife, emphasizing that what you do in your current life affects what happens to you after death.

== Ancient religions ==
=== Ancient Egypt ===
A section of the Egyptian Book of the Dead showing the "Weighing of the Heart" in the Duat

In Ancient Egypt, it was believed that upon death, one's fate in the afterlife was determined by the weighing of one's heart. One's heart was kept within the body during mummification so that it can travel with the deceased into the afterlife. Upon death, one entered the underworld (Duat), where Anubis, the God of the dead, weighed the person's heart on a scale against the feather of Ma’at, the goddess of order, truth, and righteousness. If the heart weighed more than the feather, meaning that the person was more wicked than good, then the heart would be devoured by Ammit, a demon with the head of a crocodile, the front half of the body of a lion, and the back half of a hippopotamus, but with goat arms. If a person's heart was devoured by Ammit, then he would die a second death and be completely annihilated from existence.

=== Ancient Greece ===
Ancient Greeks believed that upon death, an individual would enter the realm of Hades, the Greek underworld, and be judged by King Minos, Aeacus, and Radamanthus. Depending on one's actions in life, an individual would be sent to one of three different planes: Elysium, the Asphodel Fields, or Tartarus. Elysium is for those who were righteous in life and is reserved for good people and legendary heroes. In Elysium people relax and enjoy a life of everlasting joy in a beautiful and comfortable field with trees and sun. The Asphodel Fields is the land of neutrality, where those who were either neutral, or whose good and bad deeds are about equal reside. It is a bland place symbolizing their lack of notability in life. The final realm, Tartarus, is the realm of the wicked. It is the deepest realm of Hades, and those who have performed wicked deeds are punished here for eternity. Punishment here reflects the wicked deeds committed in one's life (e.g., Tantalus killed and fed his son to the Gods, so he was punished by being made to stand in a pool surrounded by trees with fruit, but can partake of neither water nor fruit.). Mortals shared this realm with non-mortals.

== Indian religions ==
Indian religions were extremely influential, with aspects and gods from Hinduism and Buddhism being borrowed into other religions not only in India, but also in China, Korea, and Japan. As such, many of the Asian religions have similarities in myths, deities, and concepts.

=== Hinduism ===
In Hinduism, people are judged by Yama, the God of Death, in accordance with Karma. Depending on whether or not and how closely one adhered to one's duties in life, as well as one's deeds, they would be either punished or rewarded in their next life after reincarnation. Those who performed their duties and performed good deeds would spend some time between lives in bliss in heaven, whereas those who did not follow the rules of their duties and performed bad deeds in life were either reincarnated or sent to Naraka (the equivalent of Hell) and tortured by various means between lives. There are several layers to Naraka, and people are sent to different ones for different punishments based on the severity and nature of their misdeeds in life. With the exception of Hindu philosopher Madhva, time in Hell is not regarded as eternal damnation within Hinduism.

=== Buddhism ===
Buddhism applies the principles of Karma and reincarnation much the same way that Hinduism does. There are several differing versions. In some there is no God that passes down judgement on individuals to either determine their future life or to reward or punish them for their current one. In such cases, humans, as well as all other beings except for the buddhas who have reached Nirvana, simply follow the cycle of reincarnation based on Karma until they can reach Nirvana. In some other versions of Buddhism, Yama, as well as conceptions of Naraka and punishment, are adopted from Hinduism.

=== Influence on Chinese religions ===
Chinese religion borrows heavily from Hinduism and Buddhism, including Yama and Naraka (Diyu). However, Karma and the Caste system is not employed; thus reincarnation, as well as rewards and punishment between lives and in Diyu, are based solely on good or bad deeds in life. The wicked are tortured in Diyu, which contains different levels with different punishments, just like in Hinduism, and are reincarnated either into humans with bad luck and conditions or into animals. Those who are righteous and good are either reincarnated into humans with good fortune and status or are accepted into heaven

== Abrahamic religions ==
=== Judaism ===
In Rabbinic Judaism, judgement by God occurs during the transition from the current earthly world (Olam Ha-Zeh) to the world to come (Olam Ha-Ba).

According to the Talmud, any non-Jew who lives according to the Seven Laws of Noah is regarded as a Ger toshav (righteous gentile), and is assured of a place in the world to come, the final reward of the righteous.

Those who did not obey the rules would spend time in Gehenna for spiritual purification. Gehenna was a fiery place similar to common conceptions of Hell, where the wicked would be tortured for a maximum of one year's time in order to purify them for Olam Ha-Ba. Those who were too wicked would instead be completely destroyed after being tortured in Gehenna.

=== Christianity ===
==== The Catholic Church ====
Catholics believe that all men, women, and children whether just or unjust will be resurrected, and shall come to The Day of Judgment both in body and soul. Humans are judged according to their deeds. Those found pure are saved and welcomed into the kingdom, and those found wanting enter everlasting damnation. Catholics believe that while salvation is by and through the grace of God, that human cooperation with grace is necessary as evidenced by the Parable of The Talents. They believe that the works done to merit salvation are not merited in virtue of the human's own being, who is a sinner, but as a servant and friend who acts well with the graces given them freely; thus faith without works is deemed Solo Fides and is rejected by Catholics, but so too works without Faith is rejected as Pelagianism by Catholics. Judgment Day is thus considered to require both Faith as a gift from above, but also the works of the human are judged, just as a branch of a vine is judged by its fruits. Catholics also believe in Purgatory, but as a place that is pre-Judgment Day, a purifying locale for those preparing for The Day of Judgment. If souls are purified before Judgment Day they are released where they join the Saints who are spirits without bodies, enjoying an intellectual vision of The Father who is without body, known as The Beatific Vision. There the Saints await The Day of Judgment knowing they will be resurrected to receive their bodies and will be judged pure by The Trinity, confirmed by the Apostles and Patriarchs. Not only are humans judged on That Day, but so too are other creatures like angels.

==== Protestantism ====
Protestants believe that the deceased leave their bodies and their spirit faces judgement for sin by God. Since all humans sin, the only way into Heaven is faith in Jesus Christ, who is both God's Son and God in human form. Good deeds in this life store up treasures in heaven – entering into Heaven (the true life) is worth far more than earthly riches and honor. However, salvation is through grace-alone. All others go to Hell. Once in Hell, people will suffer to varying degrees depending on their deeds in life. This punishment is eternal. When the world ends all of the dead will come back to life for their permanent judgement and placed in a new Heaven, Earth and Hell. Protestantism differs from other World beliefs in that while it allows a distinct avenue for judgement by a Higher Power, passage into a comfortable eternal life cannot be earned, but happens due to the self-sacrifice of that Higher Power by Solo Fides.

=== Islam ===
In Islam, there are two general stages after death: the minor Judgement (al-Qiyama al-Sughra) which begins for every individual the moment they die, and the major Judgement (al-Qiyamah al-Kubra) which is a set event for all the creation.

The minor Judgement, also referred to in the Quran as the barrier (Barzakh), is where all the souls remain inside the grave where they were buried waiting for Yawm ad-Din (the Day of Judgement). Every soul spends its time in the Barzakh in either pleasure or torment, and get a glimpse of its final destination through a window. Those who had many sins may face some punishment in the grave that would reduce or expiate their punishment on the Day of Judgement.

When the Day of Judgement begins, all creation is destroyed, then a new universe is created. All the creation will be resurrected in body and soul in their original form, naked and uncircumcised. The Throne of God (Allah is the Arabic word for God) will be brought forth onto the new earth, carried by eight enormous angels. God will call every person into Judgement individually, speak to them directly without a translator, and weigh their deeds on the scale. The paths after Judgement are two: the first is Jannah (Arabic for Gardens), roughly the equivalent of paradise, and the second is Jahannam, the equivalent to Hell. One's assignment to Jannah or Jahannam are determined by two things: their monotheistic belief in God without partners, and one's deeds in life. Those who believe in God and perform good deeds will be admitted into Jannah, whereas those who do not believe in God are punished in Jahannam eternally. Those who believe in God but had many sins will be sent to Jahannam until their sins are cleansed, then they are revived and admitted into Jannah.

Jannah is described in the Quran as a garden of perpetual bliss with rivers flowing underneath; it is bigger than the heavens and the earth of the current life. It is in the shape of a hill, with the center of it as the highest rank, where the Prophets will reside, right underneath the Throne of God, and where the springs of all the rivers of Jannah flow. The inhabitants live in a state of happiness and satisfaction with no worries or problems. The People of Jannah live in beautiful conditions in which they get everything they desire: beautiful spouses, clothes, servants, surroundings, food, etc.; all of the things indicative of a perfect life in the current world. In addition, they are brought close to God. Meanwhile, those in Jahannam are tortured, primarily by methods relating to scolding fire or freezing ice, for eternity, or until Allah wills for some of them to be saved.

The Quran explicitly states that Jannah is not an exclusive abode for followers of Muhammad. Rather, all monotheistic believers in God in all eras, such as Jews who followed Moses and the Christians who followed Jesus, will enter Jannah if they believed in God and did good deeds. Also, Muslims are not guaranteed Jannah. Rather they must be cautious not to die upon an act of polytheism that would lead them to the Hellfire eternally.

== See also ==
- Karma
- Last Judgment
- Weighing of the Heart

== Bibliography ==
- Illustrated Dictionary of Mythology: Heroes, heroines, gods, and goddesses from around the world, Philip Wilkinson, DK Publishing
