= List of Book of the Dead spells =

This is a list of all the 190 known spells in the Book of the Dead, and what they are for.

== 1 - 20 ==
1. For the day of burial. Often accompanied with a lavish vignette showing a funerary procession. A spell for going out into the day.
1B. Recitation for the day of burial. Spell for permitting the noble dead to descend to the Netherworld on the day of the interment.
2. A spell for going out into the day and living after death.
3. Another like it.
4. Spell for passing on the upper road of Rosetjau. Rosetjau is the "name of the Necropolis of Giza or Memphis, later extended to the Other World in general."
5. Spell for not doing work in the realm of the dead.
6. A shabti spell. First attested as Spell 472 of the Coffin Texts. The text of the spell reads:

Spell for causing a shabti to do work for a man in the realm of the dead: O shabti, allotted to me, if I be summoned or if I be detailed to do any work which has to be done in the realm of the dead, if indeed any obstacles are implanted for you therewith as a man at his duties, you shall detail yourself for me on every occasion of making arable the fields, of flooding the banks or of conveying sand from east to west; 'Here I am', you shall say.

— Book of the Dead, spell 6.

7. Protection from animals
8. Spell for opening up the West by day.
9. Identifies the owner with the god Horus, son of Osiris; and affirming that Osiris will triumph over his enemy Set, and asks for the gods to open a path for him. In the Papyrus of Ani this spell reads:

Words spoken by Ani: 'O you Soul [ba], greatly majestic, behold, I have come that I may see you; I open the Netherworld that I may see my father Osiris and drive away darkness, for I am beloved of him. I have come that I may see my father Osiris and that I may cut out the heart of Seth who has harmed my father Osiris. I have opened up every path which is in the sky and on earth, for I am the well-beloved son of my father Osiris. I am noble, I am a spirit [akh], I am equipped; O all you gods and all you spirits [akhu], prepare a path for me.

— Book of the Dead, spell 9.

10. Another spell for a man's going out into the day against his foes in the realm of the dead.
11. Spell for going out against a foe in the realm of the dead.
12. Spell for going in and out.
13. Spell for going in and out of the West.
14. Spell for removing anger from the heart of the god.
15. A hymn to the sun-god. Not a standard text; any one of a number of hymns might be used.
16. Not a text but a large vignette depicting the sunrise, referring to the daily rebirth of Ra
17. A text about the nature of the creator-god Atum. This is one of the longest, most complex, and most frequently included spells; the text is often so obscure that it incorporates comments or glosses explaining the meaning of the words or offering alternatives. The purpose of this spell was to ensure the owner could demonstrate his knowledge of religious secrets if challenged in the afterlife. It is first known as Spell 335 of the Coffin Texts. Part of the spell, as found in the Papyrus of Ani, reads:

All the evil which was on me has been removed.

What does that mean? It means that I was cleansed on the day of my birth in the two great and noble marshes which are in Heracleopolis on the day when the common folk make offerings to the Great God who is therein.

What are they? 'Eternity' is the name of one; 'sea' is the name of the other. They are the Lake of Natron and the Lake of Maat.

Otherwise said: 'Eternity governs' is the name of one; 'Sea' is the name of the other.

Otherwise said: 'Seed of Eternity' is the name of one; 'sea' is the name of the other. As for that Great God who is therein, he is Ra himself

— Book of the Dead, spell 17.

18. Often paired with Spell 17
19. Enables the dead to wear a 'wreath of vindication', a floral garland bestowed after the completion of the Weighing of the Heart.
20. The deceased appeals to Thoth to vindicate him before the tribunals of the gods.

== 21–30: Preservation of the parts of being ==
21. Concerned with the Opening of the Mouth ritual, which enabled the coffin to support life and take in nourishment.
22. Concerned with the Opening of the Mouth ritual; opening the mouth to enable the deceased to speak out in the Weighing of the Heart judgement. The words include:

My mouth has been given to me that I may speak with it in the presence of the Great God

— Book of the Dead, spell 22

23. Concerned with the Opening of the Mouth ritual. The words include:

My mouth is opened, by mouth is split open by Shu with that iron harpoon of his with which he split open the mouths of the gods

— Book of the Dead, spell 23

24. Secured some essential ability for the deceased.
25. Caused the deceased to remember his name after death. The name was regarded as a vital part of being. It begins:

I have put my name in the Upper Egyptian shrine, I [have] made my name to be remembered in the Lower Egyptian shrine, on this night of counting the years and of numbering the months...

— Book of the Dead, spell 25

26. Helped to preserve the dead person's heart, and the heart's role in re-unifying the dead person's body and soul. It is sometimes illustrated with a vignette showing the god Anubis handing the deceased their own heart.
27. Guarding against the theft or corruption of the deceased's heart by a group of gods, called 'those who steal hearts', and preventing the heart from betraying its owner at the Weighing of the Heart ritual
28. Guarding against the loss of the heart.
29. Guarding against the loss of the heart.
29A. Guarding against the loss of the heart.
29B. Guarding against the loss of the heart, by means of a heart amulet. This spell is found in manuscripts and also inscribed on heart-shaped amulets buried with the dead. Reads "I am the benu, the soul of Ra, who guides gods to the Netherworld when they go forth. The souls on earth will do what they desire, and the soul of [the deceased] will go forth at his desire".
30. A heart spell.
30B. An appeal to the heart not to betray its owner in the Weighing of the Heart ritual (later described in Spell 125. Often inscribed on heart scarab amulets as well as on a manuscript. This spell also claims to have been found by a Prince Hordjedef of the 4th Dynasty; perhaps unlikely as the spell is first attested many years later, in the Second Intermediate Period. The spell includes this section about its own provenance

This spell was found in Hermopolis, under the feet of this god. It was written on a block of mineral of Upper Egypt in the writings of the god himself, and was discovered in the time of [King] Menkaure. It was the king's son Hordjedef who found it while he was going around making an inspection of the temples.

— Book of the Dead, spell 30B

The section imploring the heart reads:

O my heart of my mother! O my heart of my mother! O my heart of my different forms! Do not stand up as a witness against me, do not be opposed to me in the tribunal, do not be hostile to me in the presence of the Keeper of the Balance, for you are my ka which was in my body, the protector who made my members hale. Go forth to the happy place whereto we speed, do not make my name stink to the Entourage who make men. Do not tell lies about me in the presence of the god. It is indeed well that you should hear!

— Book of the Dead, spell 30B

== 31–53: Protection from peril ==
31. To stop the dead being harmed by crocodiles in the afterlife.

Get back! Retreat! Get back, you dangerous one! Do not come against me, do not live by my magic; may I not have to tell this name of yours to the Great God who sent you; 'Messenger' is the name of one, and Bedty is the name of the other. The crocodile speaks: 'Your face belongs to righteousness. The sky encloses the stars, magic encloses its settlements, and my mouth encloses the magic which is in it. My teeth are a knife, my tusks are the Viper Mountain. The deceased replied: 'O you with a spine who would work your mouth against this magic of mine, no crocodile which lives by magic shall take it away'

— Book of the Dead, spell 31

32. The deceased takes on the identity of Ra and drives back eight crocodiles with a spear.

Get back you crocodile of the West, who lives on the Unwearying Stars!

Detestation of you is in my belly, for I have absorbed the power of Osiris, and I am Seth.

Get back, you crocodile of the West! The nau-snake is in my belly, and I have not given myself to you, your flame will not be on me.

— Book of the Dead, spell 32

33. Protection against snakes: "O rerek-snake, take yourself off, for Geb protects me, get up, for you have eaten a mouse, which Ra detests, and you have chewed the bones of a putrid cat" This is the first of five spells which protect the deceased from falling victim to snakes in the afterlife.
34. Protection against snakebite.
35. Protection against being eaten by snakes.
36. Protection against the apshai-insect: "Begone from me, O Crooked-lips! I am Khnum, Lord of Shen, who despatches the words of the gods to Ra, and I report affairs to their master."
37. Protection against 'songstress snakes'.
38. Protection against hostile animals.
39. Protection against snakes.
40. Protection against "him who swallowed a donkey", a snake who is shown eating a donkey.
41. Prevents the deceased from being slaughtered by demonic servants of Osiris.
42. Served the same purpose as 41, but also contains a list of all the essential parts of the body and their divine parallels.

My hair is Nu; my face is Ra; my eyes are Hathor; my ears are Wepwawet; my nose is She who presides over her lotus leaf; my lips are Anubis; my molars are Selkis; my incisors are Isis the goddess; my arms are the Ram, the Lord of mendes; my breast is Neith, Lady of Sais; my back is Seth; my phallus is Osiris; my muscles are the Lords of Kheraha; my chest is he who is greatly majestic; my belly and my spine are Sekhmet; my buttocks are the Eye of Horus; my thighs and my calves are Nut; my feet are Ptah; my toes are living falcons; there is no member of mine devoid of a god, and Thoth is the protection of all my flesh.

— Book of the Dead, spell 42

43. Prevents decapitation in the afterlife and identifies the deceased with Osiris. "I am a flame, the son of a flame, to whom was given his head after it had been cut off. the head of Osiris shall not be taken from him, and my head shall not be taken from me."
44. For 'Not dying a second time in the realm of the dead'.
45. To prevent putrefaction.
46. To prevent perishing.
47. To prevent the deceased's place being taken.
48. To go out justified.
49. To go out against one's enemies in the underworld.
50. To escape from the slaughter-place.
51. To not go upside down in the underworld.
52. To not eat excrement in the underworld.
53. To not eat excrement or drink urine in the underworld.

== 54–63: Empowering to breathe and drink ==
54. Giving the deceased power over air or water
55. 'For giving breath', that is allowing the deceased to breathe once.
56. Giving the deceased power over air or water
57. Giving the deceased the power to breathe air and to have power over water.
58. Giving the deceased the power to breathe air and to have power over water.
59. Giving the deceased the power to breathe in air and to have power over water. It is addressed to the sycomore fig tree, symbol of the sky-goddess Nut, and reads:

'O you sycomore of the sky, may there be given to me the air which is in it, for I am he who sought out that throne in the midst of Wenu [Hermopolis]. I have guarded this egg of the Great Cackler. If it grows, I grow; if it lives, I life; if it breathes air, I breathe air.

60. Giving the deceased the power to breathe air and to have power. over water.
61. 'For not letting a man's soul be taken away.'
62. 'For drinking water in the realm of the dead.'
63A. 'For drinking water and not being burnt by fire.'
63B. Prevents the owner from being scalded.

== 64–89: Coming Forth by Day ==
64. Going out by day, in a single formula.
65. For 'coming forth by day' and having power over enemies.
66. Going out into the day.
67. Spell for opening the tomb.
68. For 'coming forth by day' and ensuring power. Part reads:

May I have power in my heart, may I have power in my arms, may I have power in my legs, may I have power in my mouth, may I have power in all my members may I have power over invocation-offerings, may I have power over water ... air ... the waters ... streams ... riparian lands ... men who would harm me ... women who would harm me in the realm of the dead ... those who would give orders to harm me upon earth.

— 'Book of the Dead, spell 68.

69. Spell for being the successor of Osiris.
70. An alternate version of Spell 69.
71. For 'coming forth by day'.
72. Spell for going out into the day and opening up the tomb.
73. For opening the west by day, for opening the chamber (repeated as chapter 9).
74. Spell for being swift-footed when going out from the earth.
75. Spell for going to Heliopolis and receiving a throne there.
76. Enables transformation into any form desired. This is the first of a group of 'transformation spells', 76–88, which are about giving the deceased the power to take a number of different forms, enabling them to travel the world of the living during the day and returning to the underworld at night.
77. Spell for being transformed into a falcon of gold.
78. Spell for being transformed into a divine falcon. This spell is in dramatic form, with various characters, such as Osiris, Horus, a messenger, and "The Double Lion". It appears to be part of the text as a religious drama recited as a temple ritual. Here it is used simply as a magic spell.
79. Spell for becoming an elder of the tribunal.
80. Making transformation into a god and giving light and darkness.
81A. Spell for being transformed into a lotus.
81B. Spell for being transformed into a lotus.
82. Spell for becoming Ptah, eating bread, drinking beer, purifying the hinder-parts, and being alive in Heliopolis.
83. Spell for being transformed into a phoenix.
84. Spell for being transformed into a heron.
85. Spell for being transformed into a living soul and not entering into the place of execution.
86. Spell for being transformed into a swallow.
87. Spell for being transformed into a snake.
88. Spell for being transformed into a crocodile.
89. Allowed the ba-spirit of the deceased to rejoin the deceased. Typically with a vignette showing the ba, represented as a bird with a human head, flying over a mummy. Reads:

Come for my soul, O you wardens of the sky! If you delay letting my soul see my corpse, you will find the eye of Horus standing up thus against you ... The sacred barque will be joyful and the great god will proceed in peace when you allow this soul of mine to ascend vindicated to the gods... May it see my corpse, may it rest on my mummy, which will never be destroyed or perish.

— Book of the Dead, spell 89.

== 90–123: Navigating the Underworld ==
90. Spell for removing foolish speech from the mouth. This spell admonishes and repels an evil entity that "cut[s] off heads and sever[s] necks".
91. Spell for not restraining a person's soul in the realm of the dead.
92. Spell for opening the tomb to a shade so that he may go out into the day and have power in his legs.
93. Spell for not letting a person be ferried over to the East in the realm of the dead.
94. Spell for requesting a water-pot and a palette.
95. Spell for being beside Thoth.
96. Spell for being beside Thoth.
97. Spell for causing a man to be a spirit in the realm of the dead.
98–99. Allowed the deceased to use ferryboats in the Underworld.
100–2. Regarding the deceased's journey on the barque of Ra.
103. Spell for being in the presence of Hathor. Reads: "I am one who passes by, pure and bald; O Sistrum-player, I will be in the suite of Hathor."
104. Spell for sitting among the great gods.
105. To satisfy the ka. The ka required offerings of food, water, natron, and incense; these were shown being supplied in the vignette to this spell. These offerings also help to cleanse the ka of any wrongdoing.
106. Spell for giving gifts to one in Memphis and in the realm of the dead.
107. For going in and out from the gate of the westerners.
108–9. Ensures the deceased knows the souls of West and East. 109 also refers to the paradisical 'Field of Reeds'.
110. A depiction of the 'Field of Reeds', an afterlife in a land of plenty largely similar to the land of the living. Typically illustrated with a large vignette.
111. For knowing the powers of Pe.
112–6. Names of the souls of sacred locations in Egypt; Pe, Nekhen, Hermopolis, and Heliopolis.
117. Spell for taking the road in Rosetjau.
118. Spell for arriving in Rosetjau.
119. Spell for going forth from Rosetjau.
120. For going in and out (repeated as chapter 12).
121. For going in after going out (repeated as chapter 13).
122. Spell for entering after coming out.
123. Spell for entering into the Great Mansion.

== 124-126: Judgement ==
124. Spell for going down to the Tribunal of Osiris.
125. This spell describes the Weighing of the Heart judgement ritual. The deceased is led by Anubis into the presence of Osiris, and there makes a 'negative confession', saying that he is innocent of a list of 42 crimes, in front of 42 judges. His heart is then weighed against a feather, representing truth, justice, and the goddess Ma'at. If he is innocent, he is led to Osiris; a demon called Ammut, the Devourer, stands by to eat the heart of the guilty.
126. An additional judgement ritual, sometimes also depicted in the vignette to spell 125. The deceased approaches a lake of fire guarded by four baboons. If the deceased was evil, they would be burned by the flames; however, the blessed dead received nourishment from it.

== 127–143: Journeys in the Duat and on the Barque of Ra ==
127. 'Worshipping the gods of the caverns'; instructions on how to deal with supernatural entities who the deceased had to pass on his way. Part reads: "O you door-keepers who guard your portals, who swallow souls and who gulp down the corpses of the dead who pass you by when they are allotted to the House of Destruction... May you guide [the deceased], may you open the portals for him, may the earth open its caverns to him, may you make him triumphant over his enemies".
128. Spell for worshipping Osiris.
129. Refers to the barque of Ra.
130. Made the disparate parts of the deceased's being into an effective akh with an eternal ba. 130–136 (including 136A and 136B) all illustrate the journey of the deceased in the solar barque, and could be illustrated with the same vignette, perhaps indicating some repetition.
131. Spell for being in the presence of Ra.
132. Spell for causing a man to turn about in order to see his house upon earth.
133. Writing for making a spirit worthy, to be recited on the first of the month.
134. 'For making a spirit worthy'; a funerary spell, to be pronounced by the living, to help the deceased triumph over their enemies. Reads:

To be spoken over a falcon standing with the White Crown on his head; Atum, Shu and Tefnut, Geb and Nut, Osiris and Isis, Seth and Nepthys being drawn in ochre on a new bowl placed in the sacred barque, together with an image of this spirit (ba) whom you wish to be made worthy, it being anointed with oil. Offer to them incense on the fire and roasted ducks, and worship Ra. It means that he for whom this is done will voyage and be with Ra every day in every place he desires to travel, and it means that the enemies of Ra will be driven off in very deed. A matter a million times true.

— Book of the Dead, spell 134.

135. Another spell to be said when the moon is new on the first day of the month.
136A. Another spell for making a spirit worthy on the Festival of the Sixth Day.
136B. Spell for sailing in the Great Barque of Ra and for passing over the circle of fire.
137A. Like Spell 30B, this spell was allegedly first said to have been found by Prince Horjedef of the 4th Dynasty. Spell for four torches for the ceremonies which are carried out for a spirit. You shall make four basins of clay beaten up with incense and filled with milk of a white cow; the torches are to be quenched in them.
137B. The birth-goddess Ipet drives off Set using a flaming torch.
138. Spell for entering Abydos and being in suite of Osiris.
139. Hymn to Atum (repeated as chapter 123)
140. Book to be recruited in the second month of winter, last day, when completing the Sacred Eye in the month of winter, last day.
141. Book to be spoken on the day of the Festival of the New Moon.
142. Book for making the transfigured spirit excellent, enabling hi to proceed free in his steps, to go out by day, in any form he wishes, to know the names of Osiris in all his places where he may wish to be
143. (illustration after the litany covering chapters 141-142)

== 144–150: Gates, caverns, mounds, and guardians ==
144. Lists the names of the creatures serving as keeper, guard, and announcer at each of seven gates. their names are fairly terrifying, for instance "He who lives on snakes", or "Hippopotamus-faced, raging of power". By knowing these gates, the deceased can persuade them to let him through. To the guardians the deceased says:

O you gates, you who keep the gates because of Osiris, O you who guard them and who report the affairs of the Two Lands to Osiris every day; I know you and I know your names.

— Book of the Dead, spell 144

If uttered correctly, this spell ensures "he will not be driven off or turned away at the portals of the Netherworld".
145. An alternative form of 146.
146. Describes twenty-one 'portals of the House of Osiris in the Field of Reeds', each with a deity and a door-keeper. The names and descriptions of these entities are more elaborate and just as terrifying as those in 144.
147. A gate spell.
148. 'For making provision for a spirit in the realm of the dead'. This spell provided the names of the Bull of Heaven and his seven cows, providing an eternal supply of food and beer.

The names of the cattle are:

Mansion of Kas, Mistress of All.

Silent One who dwells in her place

She of Chemmis whom the god ennobled

The Much Beloved, red of hair

She who protects in life, the particoloured.

She whose name has power in her craft.

Storm in the sky which wafts the god aloft

The bull, husband of the cows.

— Book of the Dead, Spell 148.

149. A lengthy spell which lists 14 mounds which the deceased would have to pass in the underworld. As with the gates of spells 144–7, these mounds are guarded by gods and monsters.

150. Has no text, but is a pictorial summary of the mounds in the Underworld. However, in this spell there are 15 mounds, while in 149 there are only 14.

== 151–190: Amuletic and protective spells ==
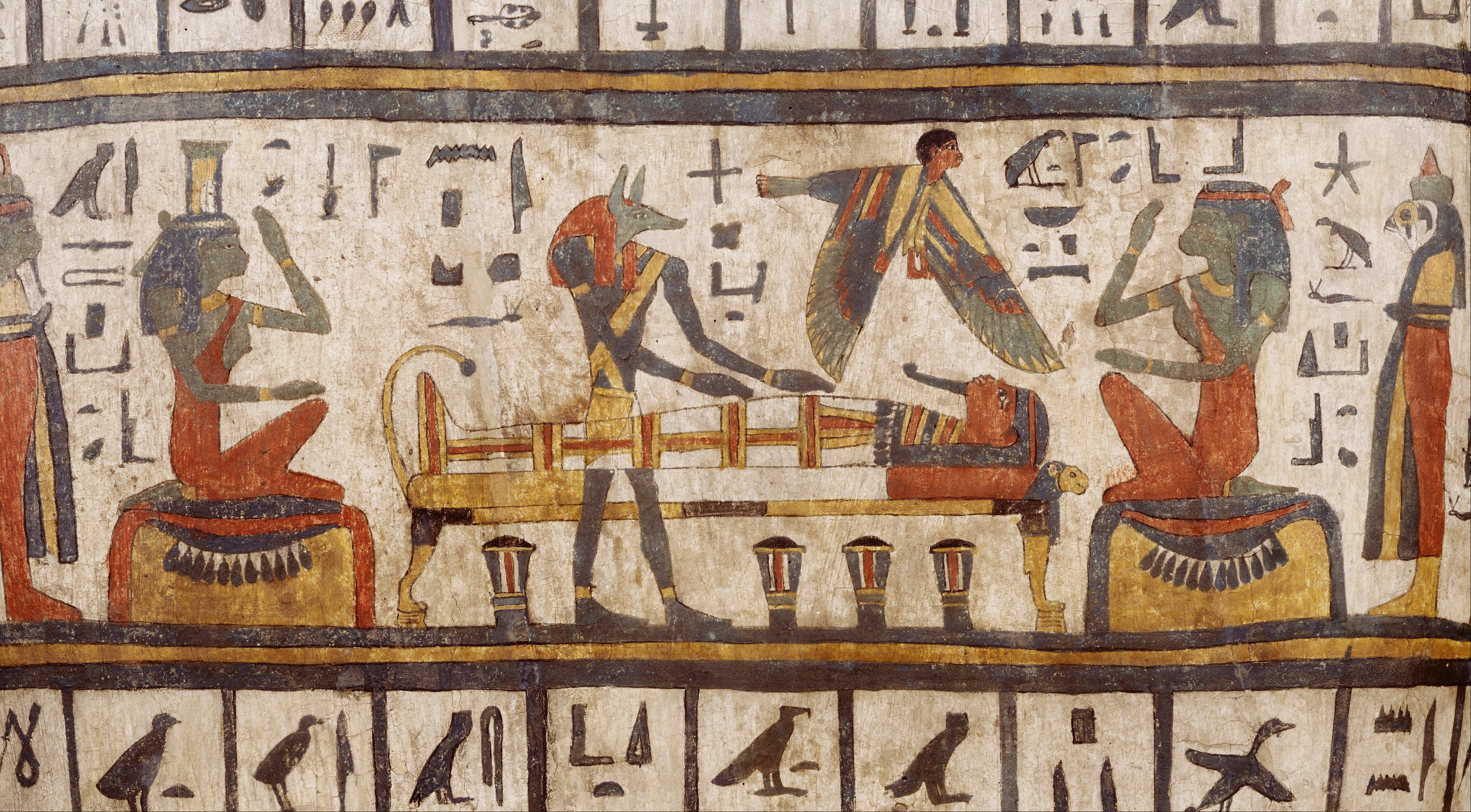
Illustration for spell 151 on a coffin, ca. 710–680 BC

151. Regarding the protection of the deceased in their tomb. This spell consists of a very large illustration, made up of a number of smaller images and texts, many of which derive from the older Coffin Texts. The purpose of this spell is to collect together the magical aids which were required for a burial, and also to perpetuate the protective funerary rituals. Some of these texts were also used on coffins, or on mud bricks placed in niches in the walls of a high-status funeral chamber.
152. Spell for building a mansion on earth.
153A and 153B. These spells both deal with the risk of being caught in a trap, a giant net which stretches between heaven and earth.

154. 'For not letting the corpse perish'; this spell describes the decomposition of the body, but assures the deceased that they will triumph over it.

155. For a djed pillar amulet.
156. For an Isis knot amulet.
157. For an amuletic golden vulture collar.
158. For an amuletic golden falcon collar.
159. For a papyrus column amulet.
160. For a papyrus column amulet.
161. Describes how the four winds are released through openings in the sky to give the dead person the breath of life. Often combined with passages from spell 151
162. A spell to cause to come into being a flame beneath the head of a spirit. 162 through 174 appear to have been composed during the Late Period.
163. Spell for preventing a man's corpse from putrefying in the realm of the dead in order to rescue him from the eater of souls.
164. A spell to preserve a person's body after death, to be said over a figurine of three-headed Mut.
165. Spell for mooring and noth letting the Sacred Eye be injured, for maintaining the corpse and drinking water.
166. Spell for a headrest and to prevent decapitation.
167. Spell for bringing a Sacred Eye.
168. This spell lists the gods and monsters of the caverns in Osiris's domain.
169. Spell for erecting a bier.
170. Spell for assembling a bier.
171. Spell for donning a pure garment.
172. Here begin the spells of praising which are made in the realm of the dead.
173. A long list of greetings from Horus to Osiris.
174. Spell for letter a spirit go out from the great gate in the sky.
175. Spell for not dying again.
176. Another spell for not dying again.
177. Spell for raising up a spirit and causing a soul to live in the realm of the dead.
178. Spell for raising the corpse, for having power in the eyes and ears and making the head firm when it has been set in its proper place.
179. Spell for leaving yesterday and coming into today, which he asks himself and his members.
180. Spell for going about the day, worshipping Ra in the West and giving praise to those who are in the Netherworld.
181. Spell for going into the tribunal of Osiris and the gods who govern the Netherworld.
182. A rare spell titled 'Book for the permanence of Osiris, giving breath to the inert One in the present of Thoth, and repelling the enemy of Osiris'. This spell invokes the power of Thoth in order to ensure the mummy of the deceased is protected by a large number of gods and spirits, who are similar in appearance to the fearsome guardians of the gates, caverns and mounds mentioned in earlier spells.
183. Spell for worshipping Osiris.
184. For being beside Osiris.
185. A hymn to Osiris.
186. A hymn to Hathor.
187. Spell for going in to the Ennead.
188. Sending a soul, building tomb-chambers, and going out into the day among men.
189. For not eating faeces or drinking urine.
190. For cutting people in half.
