= Prayers of Pahery =

The Prayers of Pahery are the prayers to be said in the tomb of a man named Pahery who was alive in the Eighteenth Dynasty.

The prayers are the second oldest archaeological evidence for the existence of an afterlife within Ancient Egyptian religion apart from the oldest which is the Book of the Dead. The texts within his tomb show:

1. A prayer which is present traditionally within tombs of Egypt, for the purposes of offerings
2. A detailed description of the afterlife
3. A prayer attesting to the quality of the service of Paheri as an official
4. An appeal for the purposes of having the living recite the prayer for offerings

Pahery was the mayor for a time of El-Kab and Esna, and scribe of the treasury. His name is spelt otherwise, Paheri.
