= Duat =

Underworld in Egyptian mythology

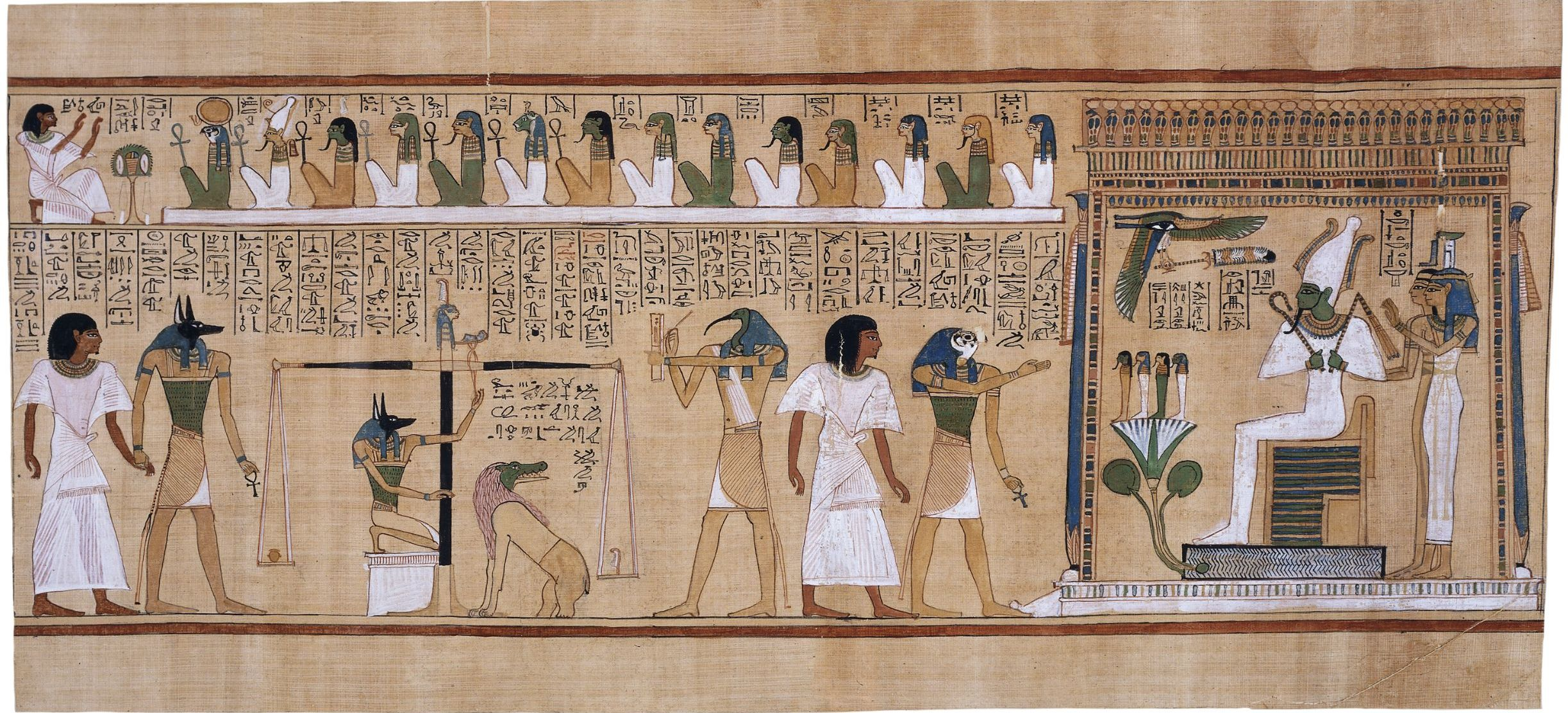
The 'Weighing of the Heart' from the Book of the Dead from the Papyrus of Hunefer, dated to the 19th Dynasty around 1275 BCE. The deceased Hunefer is taken into the judgment hall by the deity Anubis, who weighs a portion of Hunefer's soul, represented by his heart. This ritual is completed with Ammit the Devourer awaiting the result, and Thoth recording. Next, the triumphant Hunefer, having passed the test, is presented by the falcon-headed Horus to Osiris, seated in his shrine with Isis, Nephthys and the four sons of Horus.

The Duat or Tuat (Ancient Egyptian: Hieroglyph: 𓇽 romanized: dwꜣt) is a concept in ancient Egyptian mythology involving death. It is most often seen as a realm where people go after they die. Due to linguistic shifts within Ancient Egypt, the Duat has also been called Te (Coptic: Ⲧⲏ, romanized: Tē) and Amenthes (Ancient Greek: Ἀμένθης, romanized: Aménthēs).

What is known of the Duat derives principally from funerary texts such as the Book of Gates, the Book of Caverns, the Coffin Texts, the Amduat, and the Book of the Dead, among many other sources. It is generally known best as a dark subterranean realm that not only houses the deceased, but a variety of deities. Common deities depicted in these texts are Osiris, Anubis, Thoth, Horus, and Maat in various forms. While all of these documents involve the Duat, each of them fulfilled a different purpose and depict the Duat in a variety of unique ways.

== Overview ==
This realm is most often depicted as a setting for a variety of rituals and mythological events, especially the journey and judgment of the soul after death and the nightly rebirth of the sun god Ra. The Duat is divided into sections by twelve guarded gates that represent each hour of the night and are closely associated with the journey of Ra and prominently feature Osiris, god of the Duat and personification of rebirth.

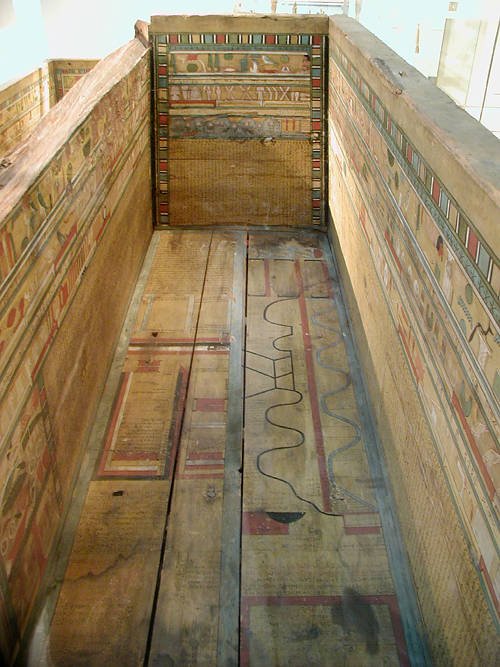
The Book of Two Ways, a Coffin Text, depicts a map like image of the Duat, seen as two pathways in the right middle of this coffin.

=== Geography ===
To connect this realm to the material world, burial chambers formed touching-points between the mundane world and the Duat. As such, the west bank of the Nile was associated with the dead and funeral barges would mimic the sun god Ra's journey through the sky during the day. To further this connection, the Duat is often described as having many realistic features such as rivers, islands, fields, paths, and lakes. Although, texts also describe fantastic lakes of fire, walls of iron, and trees of turquoise. These lands are described as being dark and were partitioned with a series of gates, and mostly identified as Shetit, a dangerous land translated as 'The Beyond'. Descriptions of the Duat often follow this same theme with titles such as 'The Hidden Place', described as a region where mortals and the divine are absent; and 'Road of the Secret Things of Re-stau', a road that Ra passes in his nightly journey.

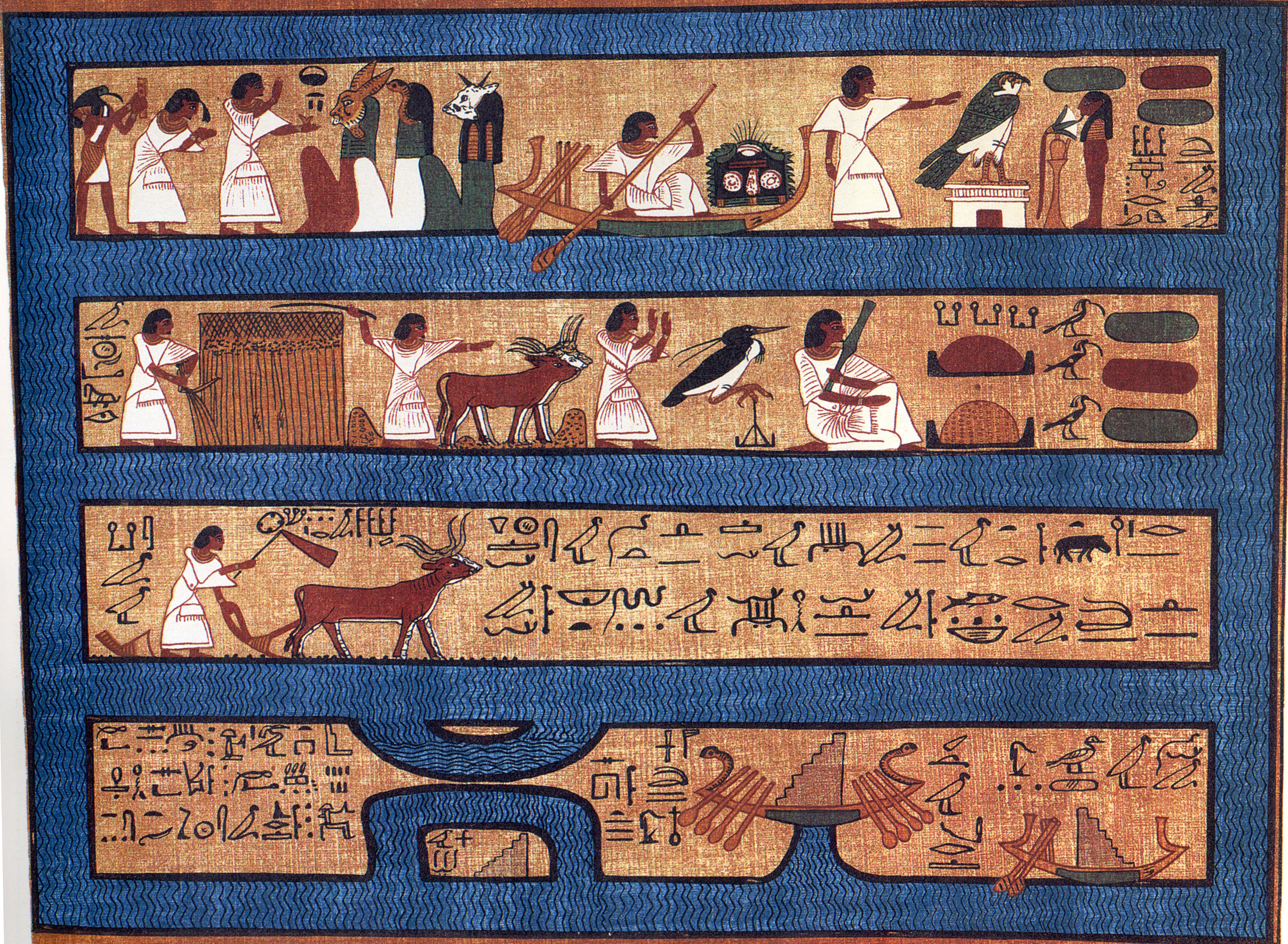
A'aru, 'The Field of Reeds' from the Papyrus of Ani

Important locations pertaining to the deceased would be 'The Hall of Truth', often depicted alongside the 'Weighing of the Heart' ritual in Books of the Dead and mentioned in the sixth hour of Ra's journey. If the dead are found virtuous, they will be permitted to dwell in A'aru, also known as 'The Field of Reeds'. It is described as a paradise where the dead could live their former life with their loved ones without pain or suffering. Harvest of crops is often featured in depictions of A'aru as it was believed that the harvests were never poor and the land in eternal spring.

=== Deities ===
There are hundreds of different divinites of varying importance related to the Duat throughout time with the most referenced being:

- Osiris, who was believed to be the lord of the realm and personifies rebirth and the afterlife. In his own mythology, he himself is reborn after his brother Seth slays him and Osiris's wife, Isis partially revives him. He is depicted as a man with green skin partially wrapped in bandages.
- Anubis, son of Osiris and Nephthys, who weighs the heart of the deceased. His domains also cover the embalming and mummification process as well as acting to guide souls to the Duat upon death. He is depicted with the black head of a canine, most often assumed to be a jackal.
- Thoth, who records the verdict of the 'Weighing of the Heart'. He is most often depicted as an Ibis headed man with a stylus and tablet.
- Horus, son of Osiris and Isis, who protects Ra during his journey through the Duat and is heir to Osiris.
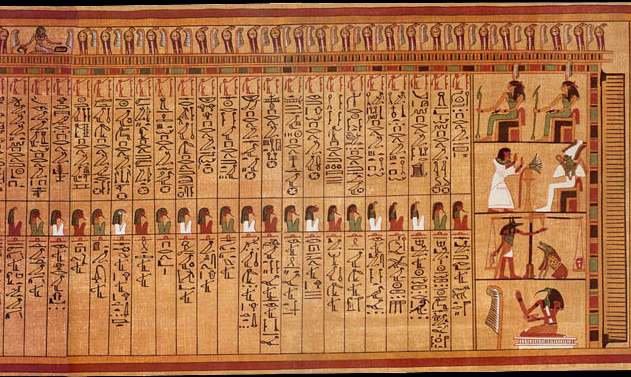
  The 42 Judges of Ma'at who sit as jury during the 'Weighing of the Heart'
- Ma'at, who is both the goddess of order and the conception of order, balance and truth itself. She is the feather that is weighed against the heart in the 'Weighing of the Heart' ritual.
- Ammit, of whom eats the hearts and souls of those who cannot pass the 'Weighing of the Heart' ritual. She is often depicted near the scales in Books of the Dead with the face of a crocodile, the mane and front half of a lion, and the hindquarters of a hippopotamus.
- Ra, god of the sun who must journey through the Duat every night to be reborn every morning.
- Apep, the personification of darkness and true chaos who attempts to devour Ra and bring about eternal chaos.

=== Mythological significance ===
==== Housing of souls and afterlife ====
In order to receive judgement the dead journeyed through the various parts of the Duat to be judged. If the deceased was successfully able to pass various challenges, then they would reach the Judgment of the dead. In this ritual, the deceased's first task was to correctly address each of the forty-two Assessors of Maat by name, while reciting the sins they did not commit during their lifetime. After confirming that they were sinless, the heart of the deceased was weighed by Anubis against the feather of Maat, which represents truth and justice. Any heart that is heavier than the feather failed the test, and was rejected and eaten by Ammit, the devourer of souls, as these people were denied existence after death in the Duat. The souls that were lighter than the feather would pass this most important test, and would be allowed to travel to Aaru.

The Duat is not equivalent to the conceptions of Hell in the Abrahamic religions, in which souls are condemned with fiery torment. The absolute punishment for the wicked, in ancient Egyptian thought, was the denial of an afterlife to the deceased, ceasing to exist in the intellectual form seen through the devouring of the heart by Ammit.

==== Journey of the Sun ====
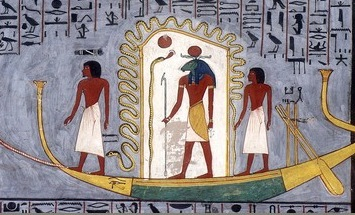
Af or Afu (commonly known as Afu-Ra), the ram-headed form of Ra when traveling the Duat on the subterrestrial Nile (the 12 hours of night and the underworld) on the Mesektet barque along with Sia (left and front of barque) and Heka (right and behind of barque), surrounded by the protective coiled serpent deity Mehen

Each night Ra travelled through the Duat, bringing revivification to the dead as their main benefit. When in the underworld he was in his ram-headed form Af. Ra travelled under the world upon his Atet barge from west to east; on the course of the underground journey, he was transformed from his aged Atum form into his young Khepri form – the new dawning sun. The role of the dead king, worshiped as a god, was also central to the mythology surrounding the concept of Duat, often depicted as being identical with Ra.

Along with the sun god the dead king travelled through the Duat, the Kingdom of Osiris, using the special knowledge he was supposed to possess, which was recorded in the Coffin Texts, that served as a guide to the hereafter not just for the king but for all deceased. According to the Amduat, the underworld consists of twelve regions signifying the twelve hours of the sun god's journey through it, battling Apep in order to bring order back to the earth in the morning; as his rays illuminated the Duat during the journey, they revived the dead who occupied the underworld and let them enjoy life after death during that hour of the night when they were in the presence of the sun god, after which they resumed their sleep, waiting for the god's return the following night.

== Differences in sources ==
A section of the Egyptian Book of the Dead that is written on papyrus, showing the Weighing of the Heart in the Duat, where Anubis can be seen on the far right. The scales are shown with the feather balance, and Ammit awaits hearts that need to be devoured.

While the Duat has a variety of depictions, the Book of the Dead (also known as The Book of Coming Forth by Day) is considered to be an important and vital resource to understanding the Duat and is one of the most studied texts in Egyptology. Therefore, the conceptions of the Duat found in this text are considered to be the most commonly referenced canon when discussing ancient Egyptian afterlife beliefs. The Book of the Dead and Coffin Texts were collections of spells and prayers to protect the dead from the Duat's dangerous landscape. None of the available sources that discuss the Duat are to lay out a geography or coherent setting, but to describe a succession of rites of passage which the dead would have to pass to reach eternal life.

== In popular culture ==
- The Duat appears as a major location in Rick Riordan's The Kane Chronicles series. It is revealed in The Crown of Ptolemy to have connections to the Mist from Riordan's Camp Half-Blood Chronicles series.
- In Assassin's Creed Origins, the Duat is an important aspect of the game with the main character, Bayek, entering it multiple times.
- The Duat makes an appearance in the episode "Asylum" of the Disney+ series Moon Knight (2022) as the place where Marc Spector and his alter Steven Grant are being guided by the Egyptian goddess Taweret in the afterlife after being killed by Arthur Harrow.
- In seminal Beat Generation author William S. Burroughs' work The Western Lands, the time travelling, anti hero gunslinger, Kim Carsons explores the Duat and confronts its inhabitants.

== See also ==
- Gate deities of Duat
- Assessors of Ma'at
- Weighing of Souls
- Ennead
