= Ammit =

Ancient Egyptian goddess

Name in hieroglyphs
Egyptian: ꜥm-mwt
(devourer of the dead)
a m F10 m t Z2ss A14
- Gender: Female

Ammit (/ˈæmɪt/; Ancient Egyptian: ꜥm-mwt, "Devourer of the Dead"; also rendered Ammut or Ahemait) was an ancient Egyptian goddess with the forequarters of a lion, the hindquarters of a hippopotamus, and the head of a crocodile—the three largest "man-eating" animals known to ancient Egyptians. In ancient Egyptian religion, Ammit played an important role during the funerary ritual, the Judgment of the Dead.

== Nomenclature ==
Ammit (Ancient Egyptian: ꜥm-mwt; ꜣmt mwtw) means "devourer of the dead" ("devoureress of the dead" (Note: Female "devourer of the dead".)) or "swallower of the dead", where ꜥm is the verb "to swallow", and mwt signifies "the dead", more specifically the dead who had been adjudged not to belong to the akhu ("blessed dead") who abided by the code of truth (Ma'at). (Note: She was also called "eater of hearts", and "great of death" in her capacity as an underworld deity.)

== Iconography ==
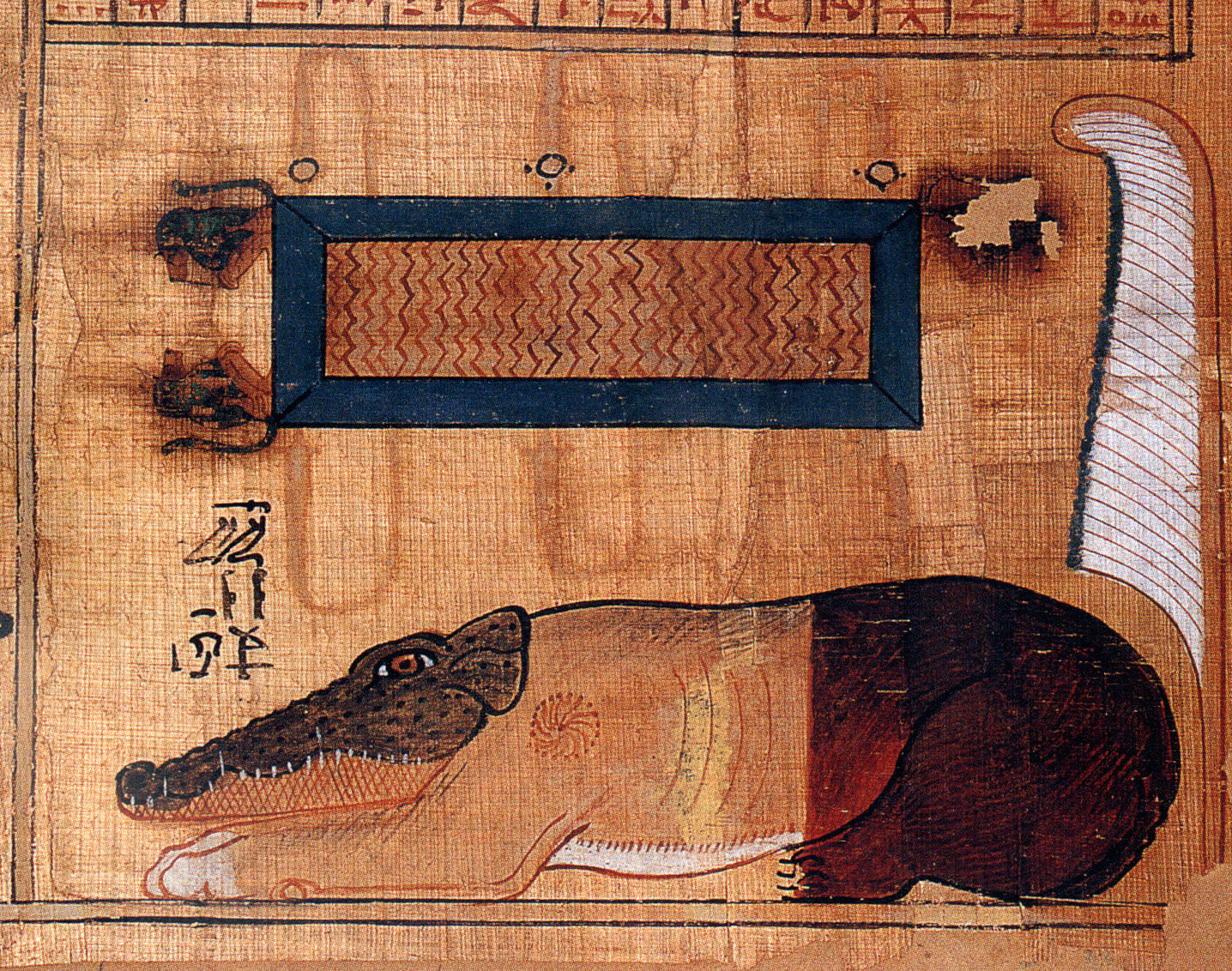
Depiction of Ammit without a mane from the Book of the Dead of Nebqed. c. 1391–1353 BCE, late Eighteenth Dynasty.

Ammit is denoted as a female entity, commonly depicted with the head of a crocodile, the forelegs and upper body of a lion (or leopard (Note: Cf. one depiction in Egyptian Book of the Dead, Papyrus of Ani, Chapter 30B (Pl. 3), where Ammit is shown with a torso of spotted fur (See image right).)), and the hind legs and lower body of a hippopotamus. The combination of three deadly animals of the Nile suggests that no one can escape annihilation, even in the afterlife. She is part lioness, but her leonine features may present in the form of a mane, (Note: Cf. Depiction on the Papyrus of Hunefer, Dyn. XIX, British Museum (shown right). A line drawing of the creature in the papyrus is given by Hart.) which is usually associated with male lions. In the Papyrus of Ani, Ammit is adorned with a tri-colored nemes, (Note: "mane that hangs down like a tripartite wig" on a burial shroud, Royal Ontario Museum.) which were worn by pharaohs as a symbol of kingship.

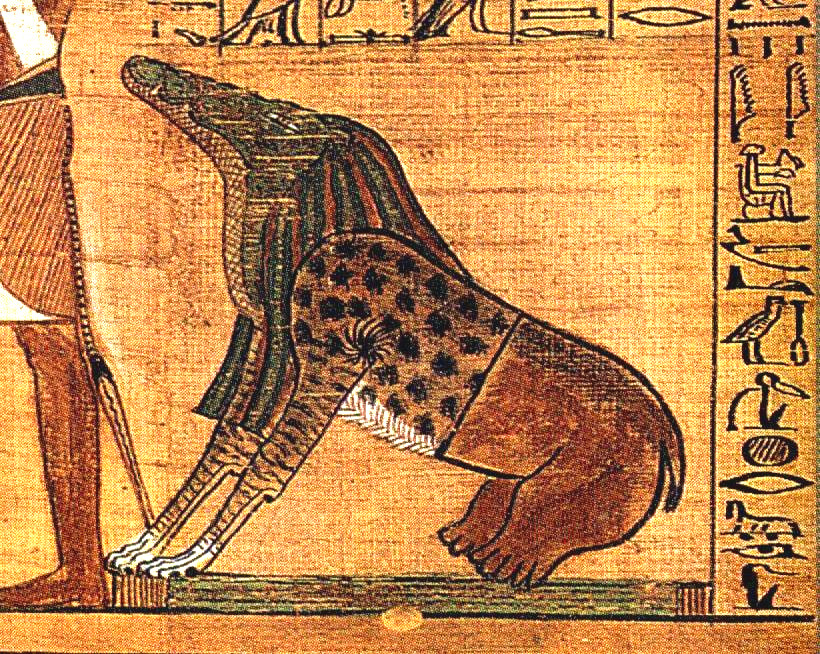
Ammit showed at the Weighing of Ani's heart from the Papyrus of Ani. c. 1250 BCE, Nineteenth Dynasty.

Versions of the Book of the Dead from the New Kingdom started to include Ammit. During the eighteenth dynasty, the crocodile-lion-hippopotamus hybrid was the conventional depiction of Ammit. She appeared in scenes showing the Judgment of the Dead, in tombs and funerary papyri. In this scene, Ammit is shown with other Egyptian gods in Duat, waiting to learn if she can consume the heart of the deceased. A stylistic shift occurred, during the Third Intermediate Period. Around the twenty-first dynasty, the Judgment of the Dead scene was painted on the interior and exterior of coffins. The coffin lid of Ankh-hor, a chief from the twenty-second dynasty featured Ammit bearing the head of a hippopotamus, and the body of a dog with rows of paps. (Note: Cf. Egyptian Book of the Dead, Papyrus of Ani, Chapter 148 (Pl. 11), where the aspect of the Guardian of the Fifth Pylon/Portal, (Hentet-Arqiu), is assumed by Ammit, and she is illustrated as a "monstrous female demon with hippopotamus body and head, pendulous breasts, lion legs and crocodile snout, squatting, with open jaws and tongue extended, forepaws, holding huge knife,..")While the Papyrus of Nes-min (ca. 300–250 BCE) from the Ptolemaic Period, portrayed Ammit with the head of a crocodile, and the body of a dog.

== Role in ancient Egyptian religion ==
Unlike other gods featured in ancient Egyptian religion, Ammit was not worshipped. Instead, Ammit was feared and believed to be a demon rather than a deity, due to her role as the 'devourer of the dead'. During the New Kingdom, deities and demons were differentiated by having a cult or center of worship. Demons in ancient Egyptian religion had supernatural powers and roles, but were ranked below the gods and did not have a place of worship. In the case of Ammit, she was a guardian demon. A guardian demon was tied to a specific place, such as Duat. Their appearance was based on a hybrid of an animal or a human and was denoted so the dead could recognize them. Guardian demons that appeared as a hybrid of animals were an amalgamation of traits meant to be feared and to differentiate them from deities associated with humanity.

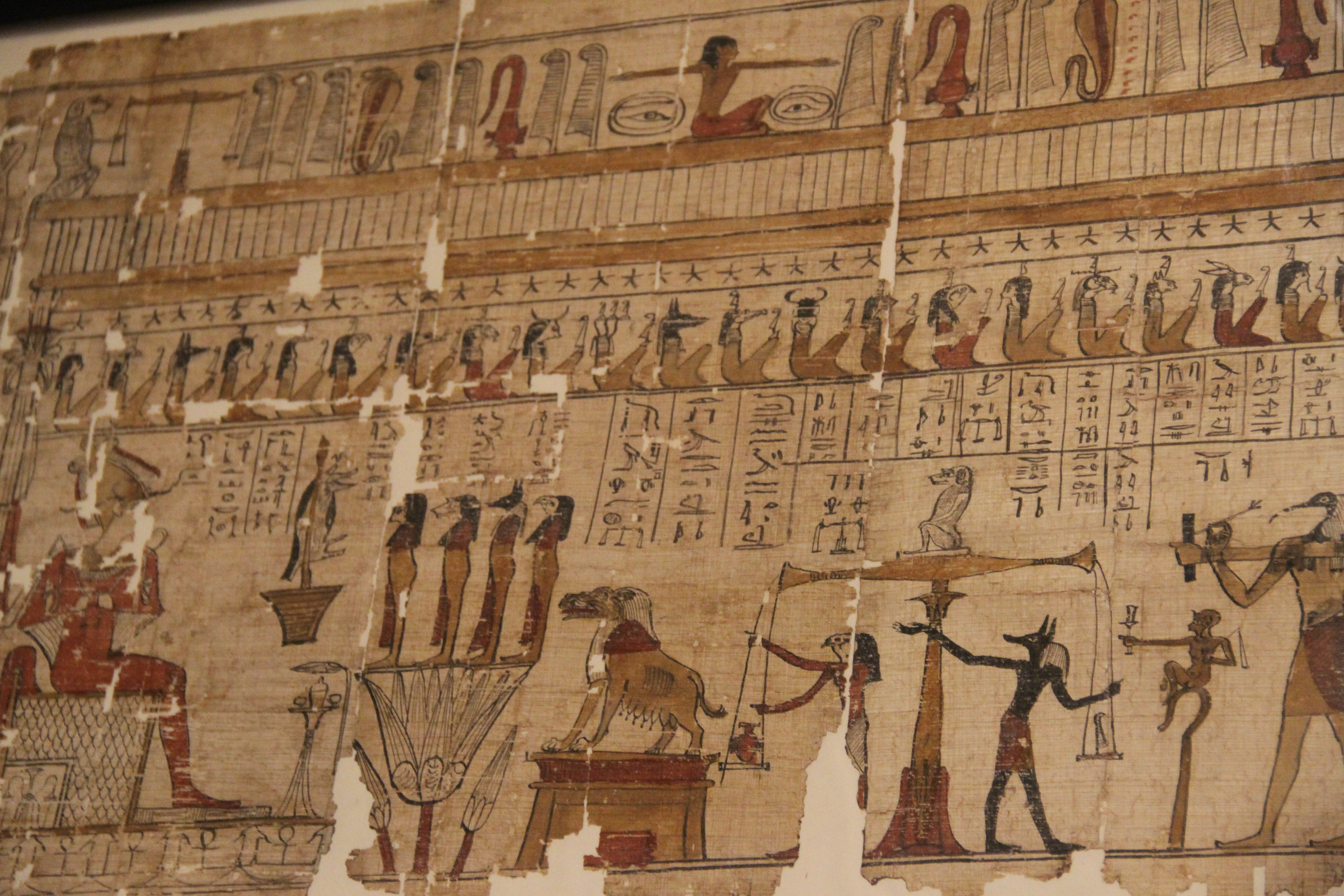
Ptolemaic depiction of Ammit standing on top of a pedestal left of the scale. She has the head of crocodile, the mane of a lion, and the body of a dog. From a Book of the Dead papyrus (c. 2nd century BCE) in Thebes.

Prior to the New Kingdom and the creation of Chapter 125 in the Book of the Dead, Ammit did not have a large presence in ancient Egyptian religion. However, Khonsu, the god of the moon, was depicted as a 'devourer of the dead and hearts' in Old Kingdom pyramid texts and Middle Kingdom Coffin Texts.

Throughout the First Intermediate Period and the Middle Kingdom, a collection of spells was created to form the Coffin Texts. In Spell 310, Khonsu burned hearts heavier than the feather of ma'at during the Judgment of the Dead. In Spell 311, Khonsu devoured the hearts of the gods and the dead. Divine hearts were devoured for their power. Hearts deemed impure during judgment were devoured, leaving the deceased trapped in Duat. These spells were among those adapted into the Book of the Dead starting in the New Kingdom.

Spells 310 and 311 of the Coffin Texts are referred to in Chapters 79, and 125 in the Book of the Dead. Chapter 79 refers to the burning of the heart, while the scene of judgment and devouring of hearts is found in Chapter 125. Instead of Khonsu devouring the heart of the dead, Ammit was referred to as the 'devourer of the dead'. Ammit was present during the weighing of the heart, usually near the scale waiting to learn the results. If the heart of the dead was impure, she ate their heart leaving them soulless and trapped in Duat.

=== Weighing of the heart ===
Judgment of the Soul based from the Papyrus of Ani. Shows heart being weighed on the scale of Maat against the feather of truth, by the jackal-headed Anubis. Ammit stands ready to eat the heart if it fails the test. The ibis-headed Thoth, scribe of the gods, records the result.

The Book of the Dead was a collection of funerary texts used to guide the dead to Duat, the Egyptian underworld. The process of the Judgment of the Dead was described in Chapter 125. The ruler of Duat, Osiris, presided over judgment. New Kingdom depictions of this scene occurred at the Hall of the Two Truths (or Two Maats). (Note: With Osiris accompanied Isis and Nephthys and the Sons of Horus. In later times, its judgment was presided by Ra.) Anubis, the Guardian of the Scales, conducted the dead towards the weighing scale. (Note: Lay literature sees fit to say that Anubis drops the heart on the scale, but scholarship stops at stating that Anubis drags the person to the scale, and also attending to the pan and plumb bob of the scale in the weighing process (e.g. Budge, Taylor here.)) Ammit would be situated near the scale, awaiting the results. While Thoth, the god of hieroglyphs and judgment, would record the results. The heart of the deceased was weighed against the feather of Ma'at, (Note: Often illustrated as an ostrich feather (the feather was often pictured in Ma'at's headdress).) the goddess of truth. The feather of Ma'at symbolized the balance, and truthfulness needed to be present during one's lifetime. The heart or Ib, represented the individual's soul and was the key to traveling to Aaru.

In Chapter 125 of the Book of the Dead, the deceased is given a series of declarations to recite at the Judgment of the Dead. The Declaration of Innocence was a list of 42 sins the deceased was innocent of committing. The Declaration to the Forty-two Gods and The Address to the Gods were recited directly to the gods, proclaiming the deceased's purity and loyalty.

After the declarations are recited, their heart is weighed. If the heart weighed less than the feather of Ma'at, the deceased was ruled to be pure. Thoth recorded the result and Osiris would allow the deceased to continue their voyage toward Aaru and immortality. If the heart was heavier than the feather of Ma'at, the deceased was deemed impure. Ammit would devour their heart, leaving the deceased without a soul. Ancient Egyptians believed the soul would become restless forever, dying a second death. Instead of living in Aaru, the soulless individual would be stuck in Duat.

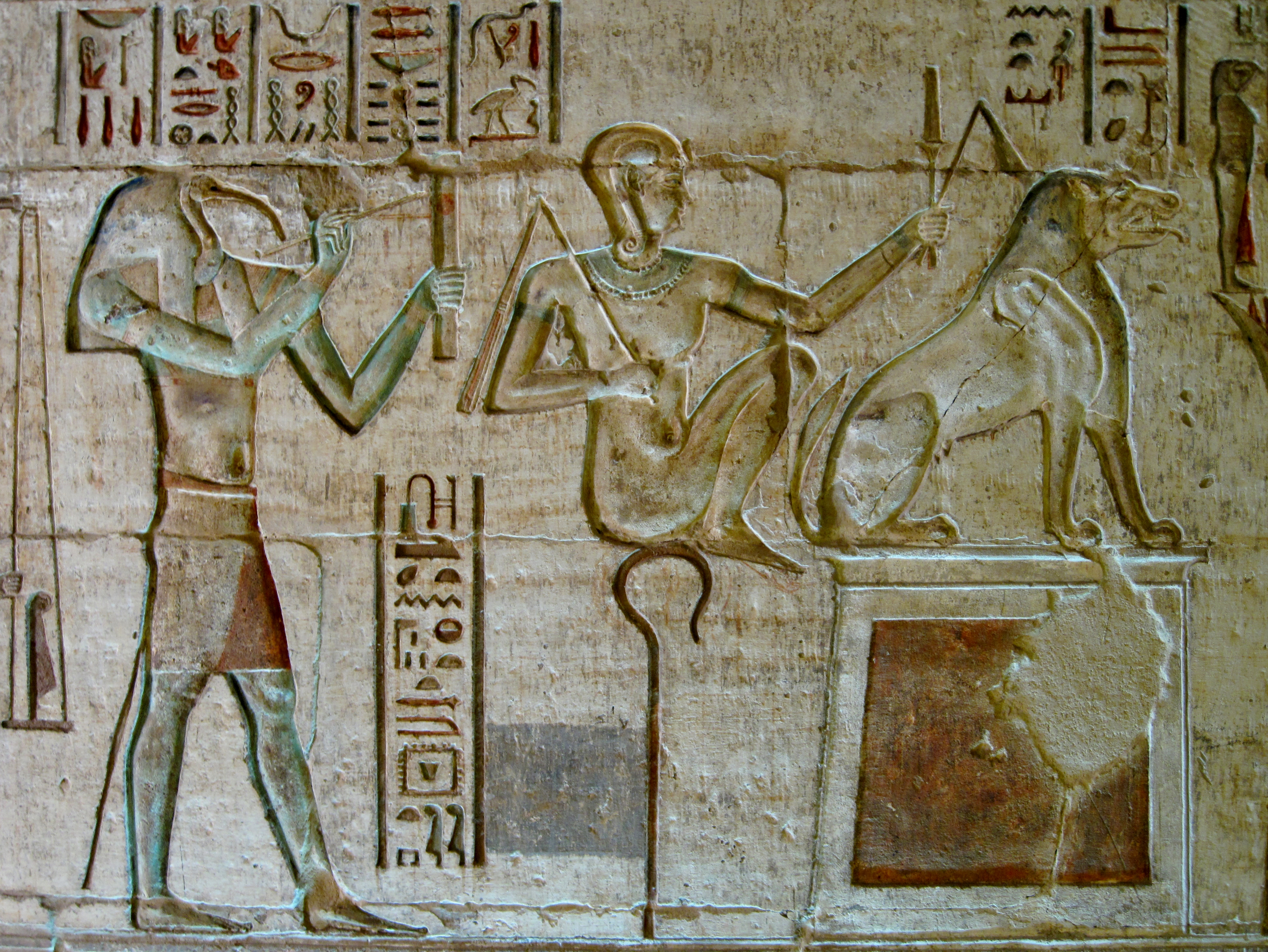
Wall carving of Ammit on a pedestal in a scene depicting the Judgment of the Dead from the Temple of Hathor in Deir el-Medina

Ammit is often depicted sitting in a crouched position near the scale, ready to eat the heart. Ancient Egyptians were buried with a copy of the Book of the Dead, guaranteeing they would be successful at the Judgment of the Dead. Thus, Ammit was left hungry without any hearts to eat, and the consecrated dead was then able to bypass the Lake of Fire, featured in Chapter 126 of the Book of the Dead.

== In popular culture ==
Saba Mubarak portrays Ammit in the Marvel Cinematic Universe (MCU) television series Moon Knight (2022). In the Mummies Alive! cartoon series, the main villain Scarab accidentally summons Ammut, and she sticks around. In the show, she is a dog-like and rather small-sized pet who does not speak. In Rick Riordan's series The Kane Chronicles, Ammit is portrayed. In Primeval, Ammit was a Pristichampsus that came through an Anomaly (a gateway in time) to ancient Egypt, where people believed it to be a god.

== Gallery ==
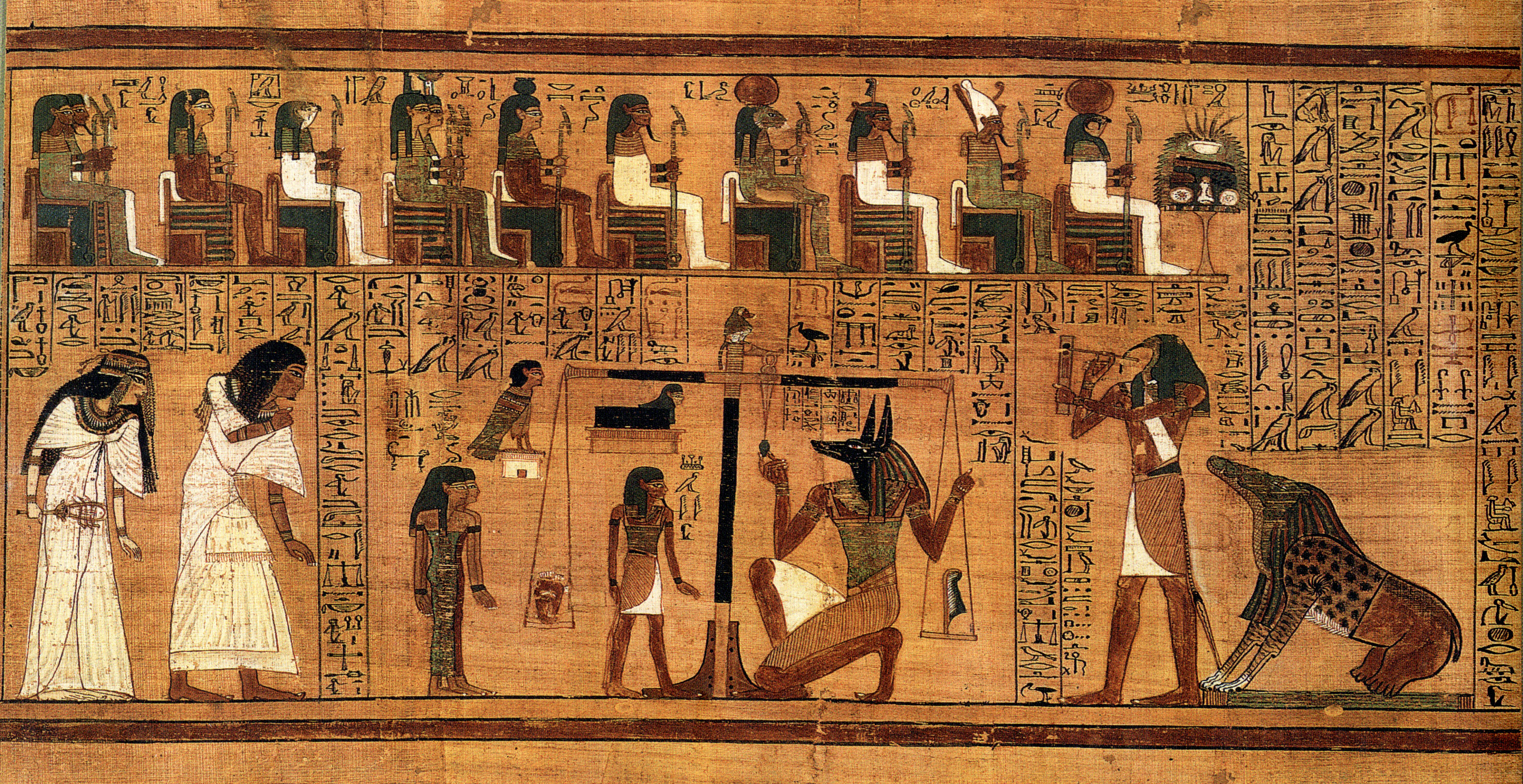
Full view of the Weighing of the Heart from the Papyrus of Ani. Ammit is shown at the far right, near Thoth. c. 1250 BCE, Nineteenth Dynasty.

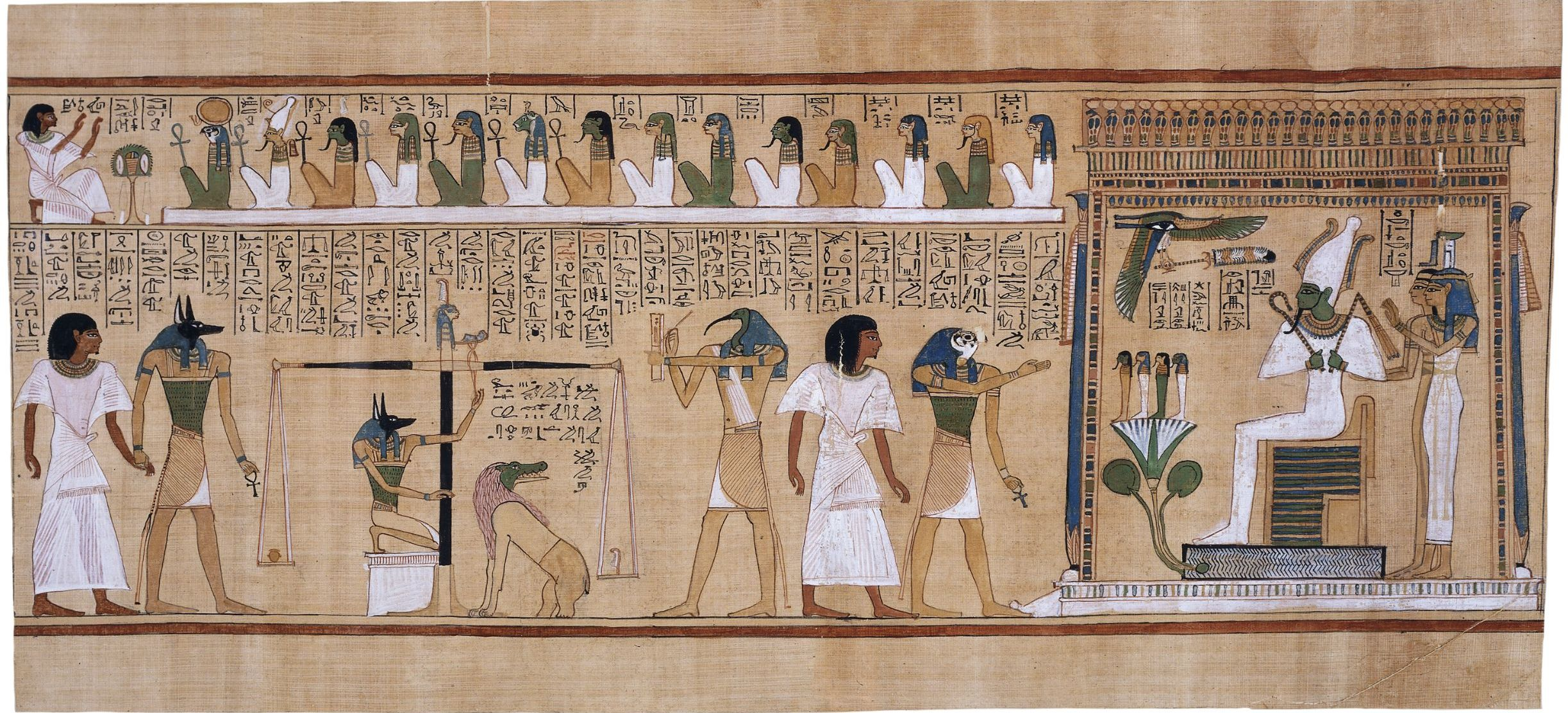
Full view of the Weighing of the Heart from the Papyrus of Hunefer. Ammit is shown next to the scale. Anubis is on her left, and Thoth on her right. c. 1275 BCE, Nineteenth Dynasty.

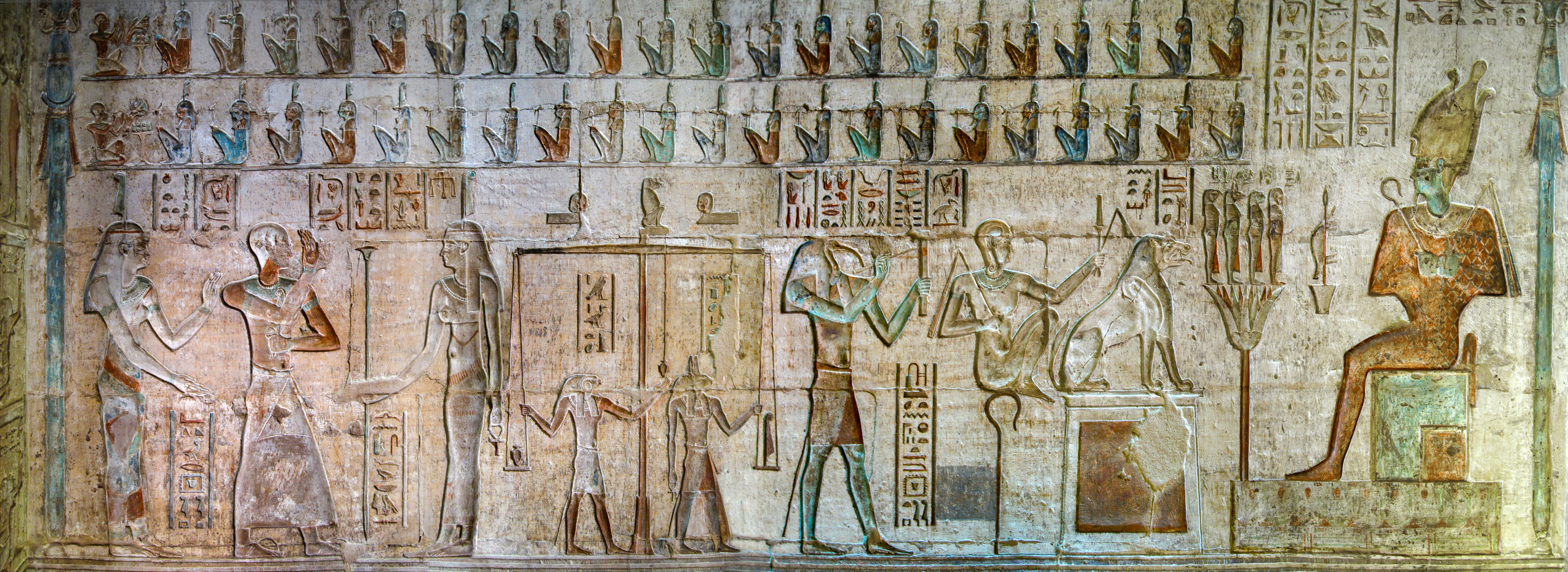
Full view of the Weighing of the Heart from the Temple of Hathor in Deir el-Medina. Thoth is seen to the right of the scale, while to the right, Ammit sits on top of a pedestal.

== See also ==
- Book of the Dead
- Chalkydri, other mythical creatures depicted with the body of a lion and head of a crocodile
- Cerberus, a chthonic creature in Greek mythology
