= Hunefer =

Ancient Egyptian scribe

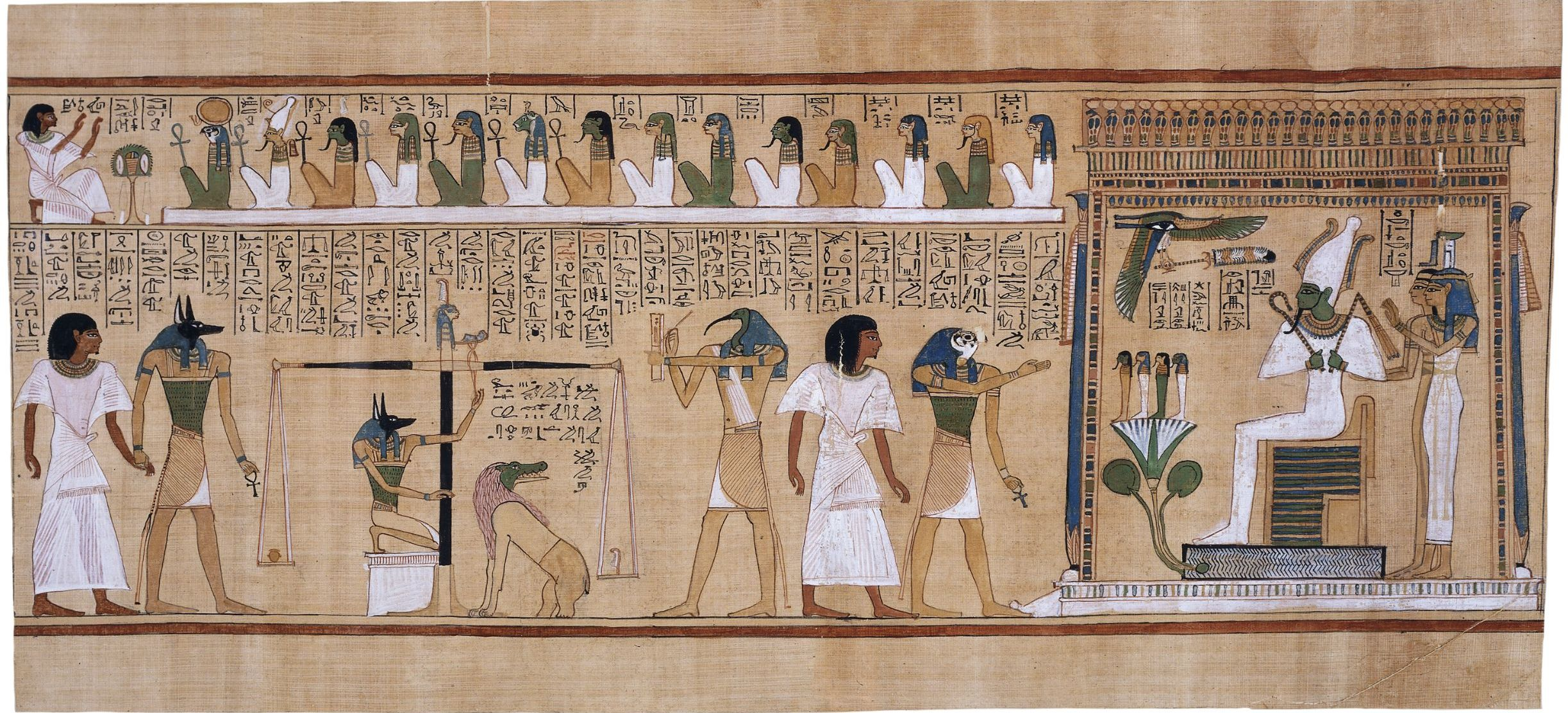
Judgment scene from the Book of the Dead. In the three scenes from the Book of the Dead (version from ~1275 BCE) the deceased Hunefer is taken into the judgment hall by the jackal-headed Anubis. The next scene is the weighing of his heart, with Ammit awaiting the result and Thoth recording. Next, the triumphant Hunefer, having passed the test, is presented by the falcon-headed Horus to Osiris, seated in his shrine with Isis, Nephthys and the four sons of Horus. From above, Hunefer kneels in adoration before a company of deities. (British Museum)

Hunefer was a scribe during the 19th Dynasty (fl. c. 1300 BCE). He was the owner of the Papyrus of Hunefer, a copy of the funerary Egyptian Book of the Dead, which represents one of the classic examples of these texts, along with others such as the Papyrus of Ani.

Hunefer was "Scribe of Divine Offerings", "Overseer of Royal Cattle", and steward of Pharaoh Seti I.

== See also ==
- List of ancient Egyptian scribes
