= Papyrus of Ani =

Ancient Egyptian Book of the Dead manuscript

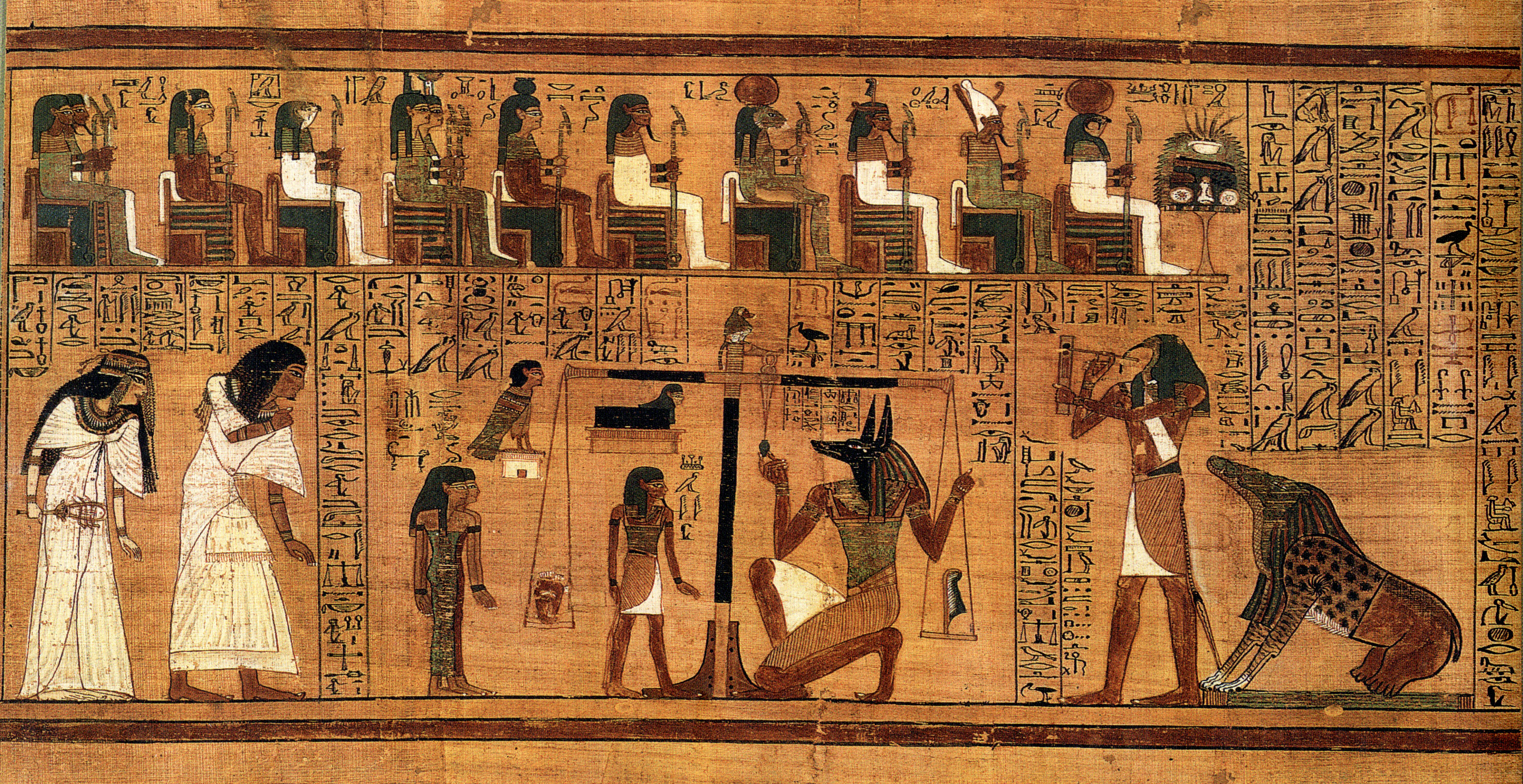
- Anubis weighing the heart of Ani
- Material: Papyrus
- Size: Length: 78 ft (24 m); Height: 13 in (33 cm)
- Writing: Hieroglyphic
- Created: 1250 BCE (circa)
- Period/culture: 19th Dynasty
- Place: Tomb of Ani
- Present location: British Museum, London
- Identification: 10470,3
- Registration: 1888,0515.1.3

The Papyrus of Ani is a papyrus manuscript in the form of a scroll with cursive hieroglyphs and colour illustrations that was created c. 1250 BCE, during the Nineteenth Dynasty of the New Kingdom of ancient Egypt. Egyptians compiled an individualized book for certain people upon their death, called the Book of Going Forth by Day, more commonly known as the Book of the Dead, typically containing declarations and spells to help the deceased in their afterlife. The Papyrus of Ani is the manuscript compiled for the Theban scribe Ani; it is now in the British Museum.

The scroll was discovered in the tomb of Ani in Thebes in 1888 by Egyptians trading in illegal antiquities. It was acquired by E. A. Wallis Budge, as described in his autobiography By Nile and Tigris. Shortly after Budge first saw the papyrus, Egyptian police arrested several antiquities dealers and sealed up their houses, one of which contained the objects Budge had purchased from the dealers. Budge distracted the guards by offering them a meal while locals tunnelled under the house's walls to retrieve the objects, including the Papyrus of Ani. Stored in several custom tin boxes, the papyrus and other objects Budge had acquired were then smuggled to the principal librarian at the British Museum.

Budge was afterward paid a 150GBP "gratuity" from the British Treasury on behalf of the British Museum for acquiring the papyrus.

It is considered to be the finest extant example of the Book of the Dead.

== Contents ==
Divisions	Sections	Title
01	16	Hymns
02	36	Praises of Khert-Neter
03	08	Seven Arits
04	10	Pylons of the House of Osiris
05	05	Speeches
06	22	Hail Thoths
07	32	Chapter Collection 1
08	20	Homages
09	19	Miscellaneous (Hymns, Hails, Homage, Chapter, Rubric)
10	18	Chapter Collection 2
11	20	Funeral Chamber Texts

Note: Divisions vary based on compilations; Sections are groups of related sentences; Titles are not original to the text.

== Gallery ==
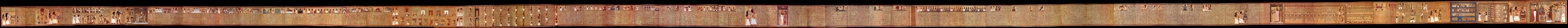
The entire Papyrus of Ani. (Scroll left or right.)

== See also ==
- List of ancient Egyptian papyri
- Maat: 42 Negative Confessions (Papyrus of Ani)
