= Ancient Egyptian afterlife beliefs =

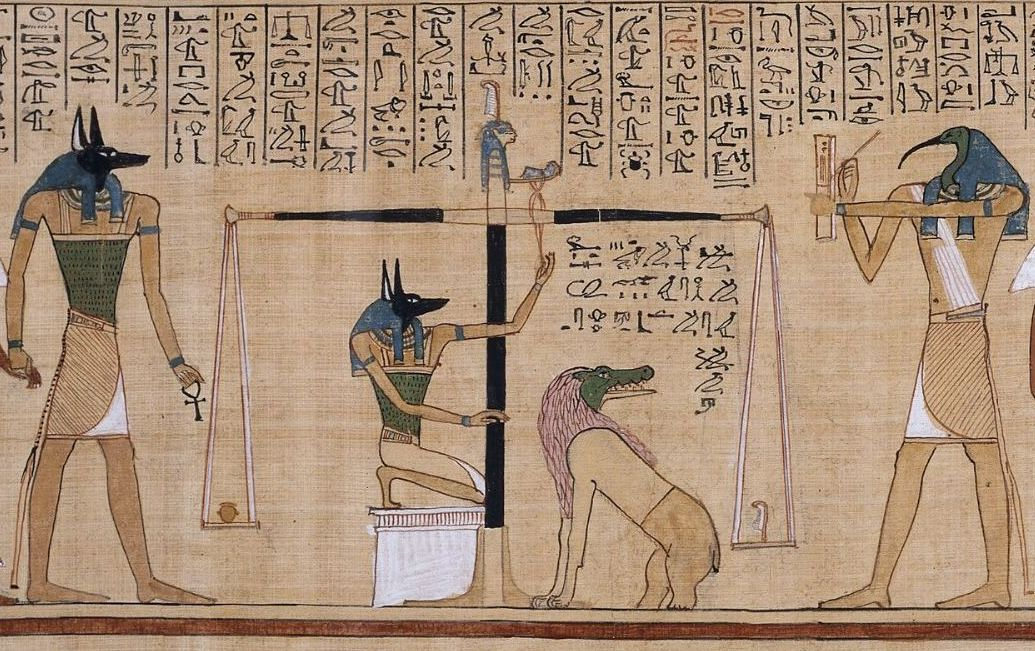
This detail scene from the Papyrus of Hunefer (c. 1375 BC) shows Hunefer's heart being weighed on the scale of Maat against the feather of truth, by the jackal-headed Anubis. The ibis-headed Thoth, scribe of the gods, records the result. If his heart is lighter than the feather, Hunefer is allowed to pass into the afterlife. If not, he is eaten by the waiting Ammit. Vignettes such as these were a common illustration in Egyptian books of the dead.

Ancient Egyptian afterlife beliefs were centered around a variety of complex rituals that were influenced by many aspects of Egyptian culture. Religion was a major contributor, since it was an important social practice that bound all Egyptians together. For instance, many of the Egyptian gods played roles in guiding the souls of the dead through the afterlife. With the evolution of writing, religious ideals were recorded and quickly spread throughout the Egyptian community. The solidification and commencement of these doctrines were formed in the creation of afterlife texts which illustrated and explained what the dead would need to know in order to complete the journey safely.

Egyptian religious doctrines included three afterlife ideologies: belief in an underworld, eternal life, and rebirth of the soul. The underworld, also known as the Duat, had only one entrance that could be reached by traveling through the tomb of the deceased. The initial image a soul would be presented with upon entering this realm was a corridor lined with an array of fascinating statues, including a variation of the hawk-headed god, Horus. The path taken to the underworld may have varied between kings and common people. After entry, spirits were presented to another prominent god, Osiris. Osiris would determine the virtue of the deceased's soul and grant those deemed deserving a peaceful afterlife. The Egyptian concept of 'eternal life' was often seen as being reborn indefinitely. Therefore, the souls who had lived their life elegantly were guided to Osiris to be born again.

In order to achieve the ideal afterlife, many practices had to be performed during one's life. This may have included acting justly and following the beliefs of the Egyptian creed. Additionally, the Egyptians stressed the rituals completed after an individual's life has ended. In other words, it was the responsibility of the living to carry out the final traditions required so the dead could promptly meet their final fate. Ultimately, maintaining high religious morals by both the living and the dead, as well as complying to a variety of traditions, guaranteed the deceased a smoother transition into the underworld.

Egyptians hoped to perform their jobs and partake in their hobbies in the afterlife. Rivers and natural locales with fertile soil for farmers were thought to exist in the afterlife, and drawings on tomb walls of objects such as boats were thought to make them appear in the afterlife for previous users or owners.

== Funeral practices ==
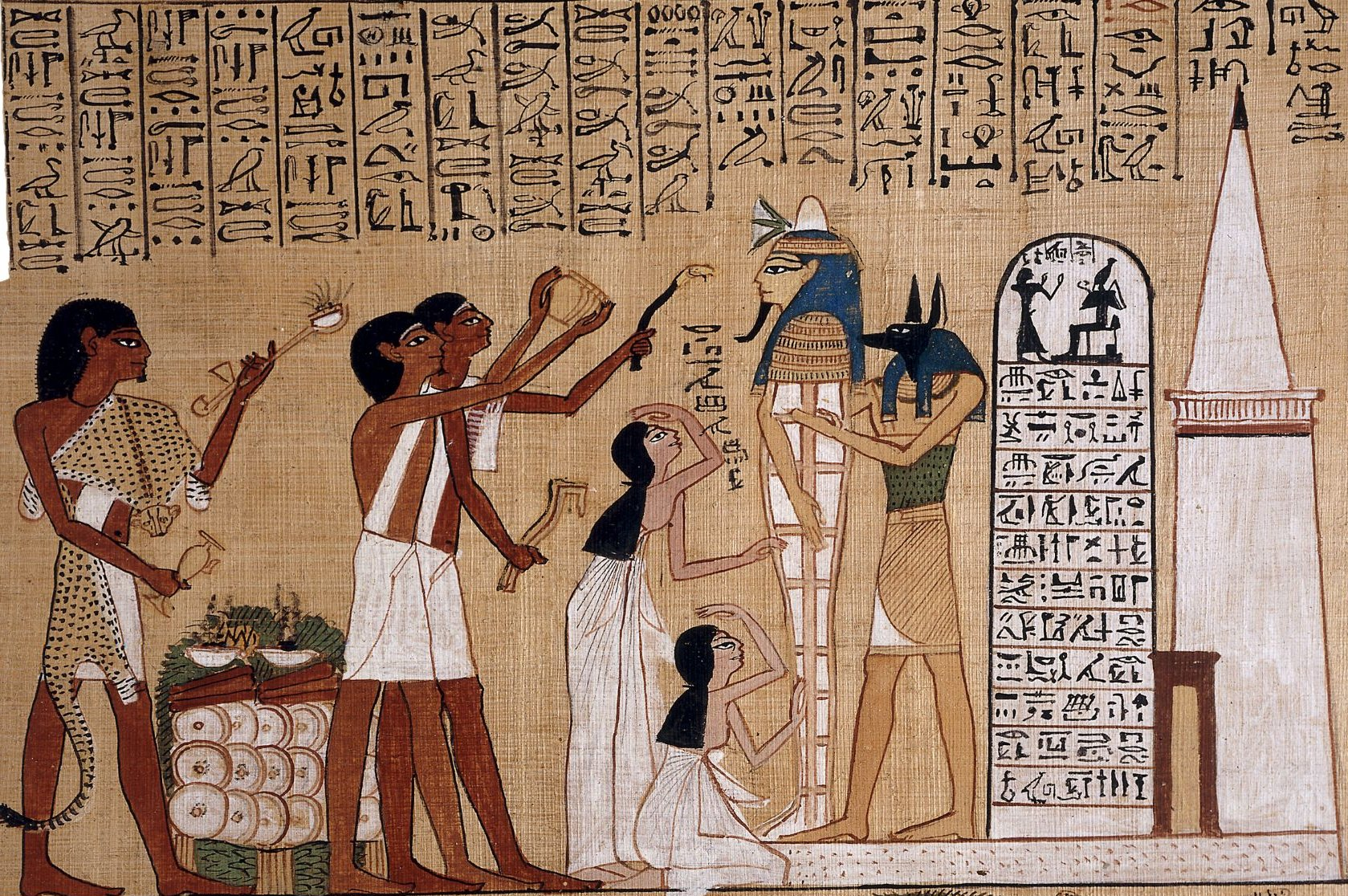
The Opening of the Mouth ceremony being performed on a mummy before the tomb. Anubis attending the mummy of the deceased. Extract from the Papyrus of Hunefer, a 19th-Dynasty Book of the Dead (c. 1300 BC)

There were many challenges the dead had to face before they were able to enter into the final stages of the afterlife. However, through the support of the living, the dead had access to the protection and knowledge they would need to be reborn in the netherworld.

=== Tombs ===
The design and scale of Egyptian burial tombs varied from period to period, even though their function remained the same. While most tombs were built during the lifetime of the person it was meant for, Egyptian tombs were constructed to house the body of the dead, but also functioned to transmit the soul to the underworld. Most of what was found in a tomb depended on the status of the person buried within it. However, in order to assist the dead, most tombs were decorated with texts meant to help guide the deceased's soul to the afterlife, something that was attainable to all. It was believed that a false door was a threshold between the worlds of the living and the dead and through which a deity or the spirit of the deceased could enter and exit. Pharaohs' tombs were provided with vast quantities of wealth. Grave goods and treasury are usually personal possessions, supplies to smooth the deceased's journey into the afterlife or offerings to the gods.

=== Afterlife texts ===
Throughout the centuries, the Egyptian people decorated their tombs and coffins with religious spells and texts hoping to help the dead in the afterlife. As Egyptian culture developed, these texts also evolved and became more complex and extensive in nature.

==== Pyramid Texts ====
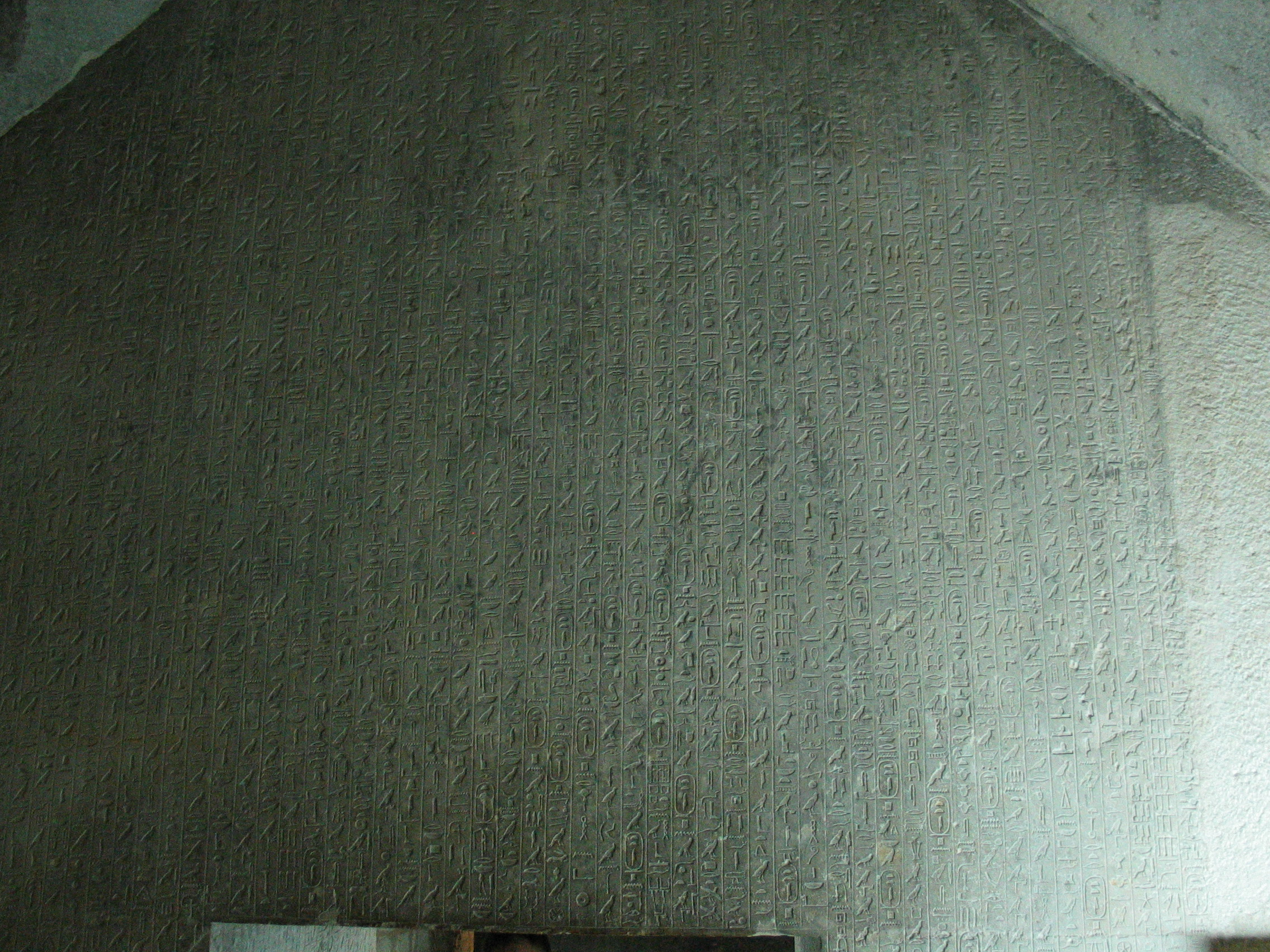
Pyramid Text within the burial pyramid of Teti I

The Pyramid Texts were the first religious spells to be carved into the walls of royal ancient Egyptian pyramids. Beginning in the Old Kingdom period, these texts were used exclusively by the Egyptian pharaohs to decorate the walls of their tombs. However, Egyptian Queens and high-ranking government officials soon began to use Pyramid Texts in their burial tombs as well. The purpose of these texts were to help the pharaoh successfully complete his journey through the afterlife, by conveying knowledge to the deceased about the paths he should take and the dangers he might face along the way.

==== Coffin Texts ====
In the Middle Kingdom period the Pyramid Texts were replaced by the Coffin Texts. The Coffin Texts were spells that were inscribed into the coffins of the dead. They were meant to protect the deceased in the afterlife and provide them with the transformation magic they would need along their journey. These Coffin Texts were generally more attainable, providing the common people of Egypt the opportunity to attain a proper afterlife. It is also important to note that the collection of Coffin Texts known as The Book of Two Ways functioned as the earliest manual to the afterlife.

==== Book of the Dead ====
The Book of the Dead was an extensive collection of spells that included material from both the Pyramid Texts and the Coffin Texts. In the New Kingdom period, the Book of the Dead was normally recorded on papyrus. However, it could also be found on tomb walls, coffins and the wrappings of mummies. Like the Coffin Texts, the spells illustrated within the Book of the Dead were used by everyone. These spells offered advice, protection and knowledge to the dead as they journeyed through the netherworld.

==== Books of the Netherworld ====
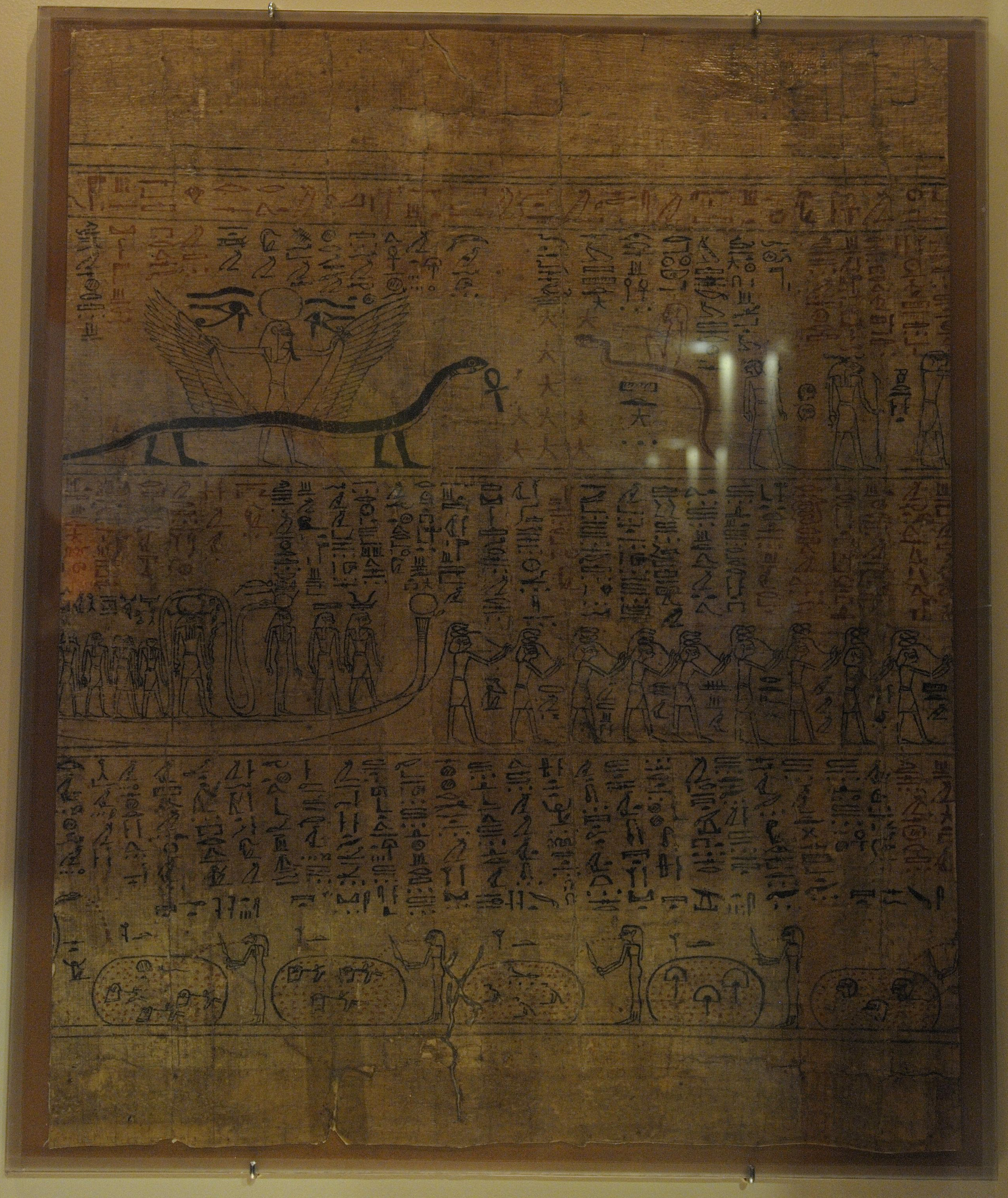
The 11th hour of the book Amduat

The Books of the Netherworld contained multiple texts that provided the deceased with a description of the underworld and served as a guide to help the dead during their final journey. Since the deceased were often seen replicating the rebirth cycle of Ra as they traveled through the afterlife, these texts primarily focused on the second half of the sun god's journey, which took him through the underworld at night. The earlier Books of the Netherworld, which include the Amduat and the Book of Gates, divided their narratives into twelve parts, symbolizing the twelve hours the sun god spent in the underworld. Later books such as the Book of Caverns and the Book of the Earth used a more sectionalized approach when presenting their narratives. All of these books also contained complex illustrations of the netherworld, which could often be seen etched into coffins and the walls of burial tombs.

==== Books of the Sky ====
The Books of Sky consisted of three afterlife texts titled, the Book of Nut, the Book of Day and the Book of Night. Carved into the ceiling of tombs these texts emphasized the role the goddess Nut played in the Egyptian afterlife.

=== Coffins ===
Coffins in Egyptian culture date back to the Old Kingdom. During this era, coffins were relatively simple; they were equilateral makings with minor details. These included three openings, one that the Ka was intended to pass through and two that represented eyes. However, as time passed coffins and their structures evolved. By the New Kingdom, coffins had not only become more popular around the area but were distributed for sale. The deceased's body was now represented by the coffin as it held a shape and was decorated with features that resembled the individual inside it. The deceased were also often depicted in white clothes, because it represented the soul's purity after it had passed through judgement, in the Hall of Maat. Additionally, the orientation of the deceased was very important to ancient Egyptians. In early periods, the body would have laid promptly on their side with their head directed to the south. This later shifted and with the body flat on its back, the north became a more favorable position for the dead's head to lie.

=== Mummification process ===
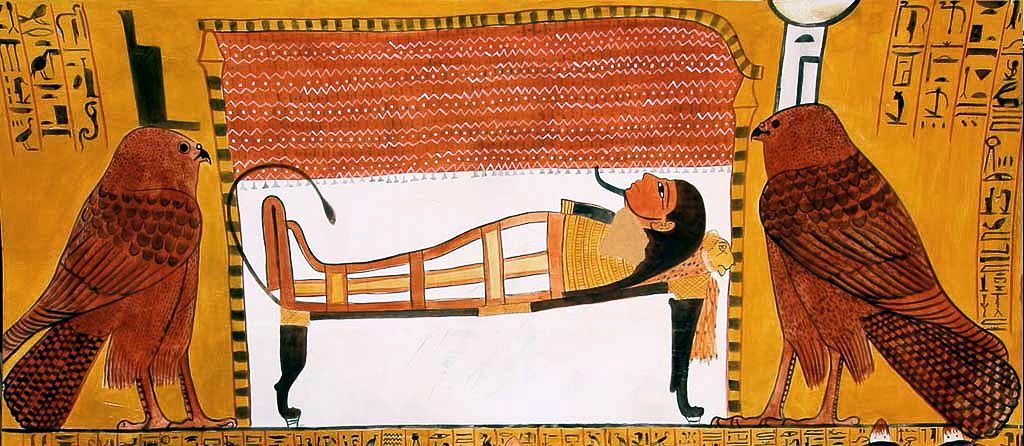
Isis (left) and Nephthys (right) as kites near the bier of a mummy, thirteenth century BCE

Mummification was a practice that the ancient Egyptians adopted because they believed that the body needed to be preserved in order for the dead to be reborn in the afterlife. Initially, Egyptians thought that like Ra, their physical bodies, or Khat, would reawaken after they completed their journey through the underworld. Once the Egyptians realized that the bodies of their dead would eventually decay, they started to see the remains of the dead as a vessel for the deceased's spirit. The body was dismembered and wrapped in bandages to safeguard it, if the soul decided to return. The heart scarab was an amulet used as a grave good or jewelry worn by the deceased pharaoh. The function of the heart scarab was to bind the heart to silence while it was being weighed in the underworld to ensure that the heart did not bear false witness against the deceased. A heart scarab was often placed on their heart and bound underneath the bandages of the mummy. This was to ensure that it could not be physically removed from their person.

=== Funeral offerings ===
Many Egyptians considered the tomb to be a home for the dead, so it was customary to leave offerings near the body of the deceased. Egyptians believed that even after death, one's spirit would live on because the life force was a separate entity that could detach itself from the body. This life force was named the Ka, and was considered to be one part of what the Egyptian believed to be the immortal soul. The Ba was another part of the soul that had increased mobility and dwel within the Ka. Offerings that were left for the dead included clothing and valuable ornaments; the most important offering, however, was food, because even though the Ka was separated from the body, it could still starve.

== Journey to the afterlife ==
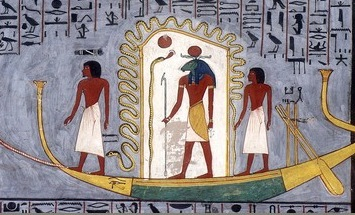
Af or Afu (commonly known as Afu-Ra), the ram-headed form of Ra when traveling the Duat on the subterrestrial Nile (the 12 hours of night and the underworld) on the Mesektet barque along with Sia (left and front of barque) and Heka (right and behind of barque), surrounded by the protective coiled serpent deity Mehen

Ancient Egyptians theorized the passage to the afterlife in a series of stages. The first phase was believed to encompass the vehicle of transportation, which would eventually direct their departed souls to immortality.

Boat passages to the underworld were strictly reserved for pharaohs who had died. The Egyptian sun god, Ra, was believed to travel to the underworld by boat as the sun set. As a way to mimic Ra's daily expedition, the ancient people of Egypt would construct model boats, ranging in many sizes in which they would bury alongside their pharaohs. For example, next to the Pyramid of Khufu, researchers uncovered Khufu ship, a boat the size of traditional ships, which displayed not only the extreme devotion Egyptians had for their leader, but their dedication to obtaining eternity for all. In other words, a great deal of the requirements for the deceased to properly reach the underworld rested on the living. In order for the pharaoh to arrive at his final destination, his people had to construct a variety of boats to ensure his departure. As a result, communities had to come together to support each other, otherwise their perspective of immortality, as well as their beliefs, would end indefinitely. Therefore, commitment to helping others achieve eternity was a vital component to Egyptian culture, as demonstrated by the gallant boats buried with their rulers.

Additionally, an alternate vehicle for entrance to the underworld was the coffin. While kings often used coffins in addition to, or in substitution of the boat belief, everyday citizens had less choice. Therefore, this method was more universal while alluding to a different, more frequent path of entry. To compare, while passages by boat directed the deceased to the sun god Ra, coffins were thought to guide individuals to the sky goddess Nut. Each coffin was uniquely attributed to the person who rested in it. In other words, every coffin was subject to a variety of interpretations, all of which were intended to promote the deceased in obtaining eternity.

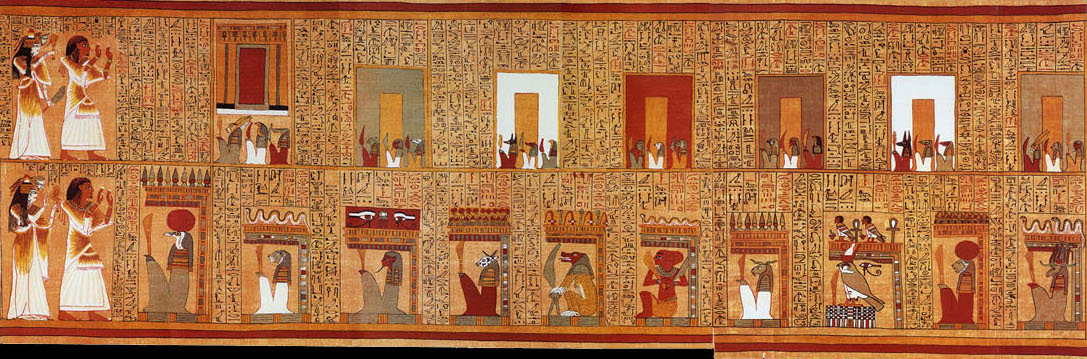
Ani and his wife face the 'seven gates of the House of Osiris'. Below, they encounter ten of the 21 'mysterious portals of the House of Osiris in the Field of Reeds'. All are guarded by gate deities.

The path to the afterlife for the deceased was a difficult one. There were various gates, doors and pylons located in Duat, which the deceased would be required to pass. These gates had deities in charge of guarding them, sometimes there are more than 1,000 guardian deities listed, according to Ancient funerary texts. Every gate was guarded by a minor deity, commonly depicted as being zoo-anthropomorphic adorned with enormous threatening knives, who allowed access only to the souls capable of pronouncing the secret name of the deity themself, as a sort of "password". Therefore, the deceased would be buried with writings containing the names of these deities. A lot of these deities were given names that inspired terror and, above all, evoked their fearful powers. The names of these deities from time to time are disturbing, for instance, "He who dances in blood" and "Mistress Of Anger", or as harmless as "Mistress Of The Altar".

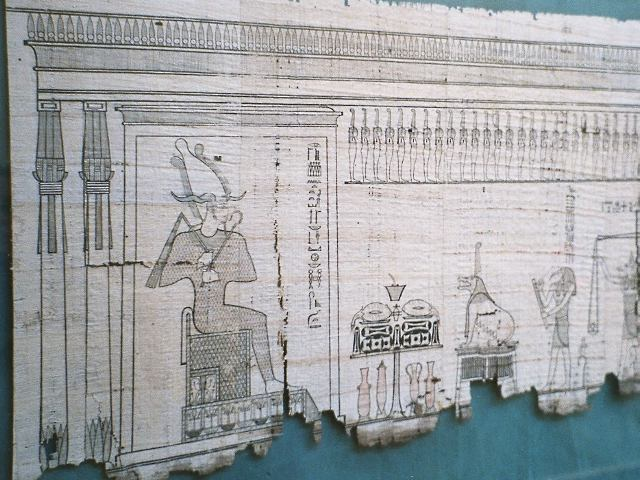
A section of the Book of the Dead showing the Weighing of the Heart in the Duat. The enthroned Osiris is seated in his shrine

Ancient Egyptians saw Wepwawet as one who opened the ways to, and through, Duat, for the spirits of the dead. However, not all who died were presented with the opportunity to travel to the underworld. Since the living were obligated to ensure that the deceased could travel to the afterlife, it was also in their control to eliminate one's chance in achieving eternity. Therefore, the living had an array of options that prevented a second life to an unworthy individual who had died. The most famous included decapitation, which when executed, "killed a person twice". As a result, the second death associated with decapitation was also assumed to have annihilated the chance at another life. As noted in Egyptian texts, this instance was incredibly feared, but happened most often to those who rebelled or disobeyed the king.

== Judgment of the dead ==
The Weighing of the Heart in the Hall of Maat.

To the ancient Egyptians, the judgment of the dead was the process that allowed the Egyptian gods to judge the worthiness of the souls of the deceased. Deeply rooted in the Egyptian belief in immortality, judgment was one of the most important parts of the journey through the afterlife. As such, many variations of judgment scenes appear in the Egyptian afterlife texts. Each soul that entered the afterlife was handled individually during judgment. When the deceased had completed their journey through the underworld, they arrived at the Hall of Maat. Here their purity would be the determining factor in whether they would be allowed to enter the Kingdom of Osiris.

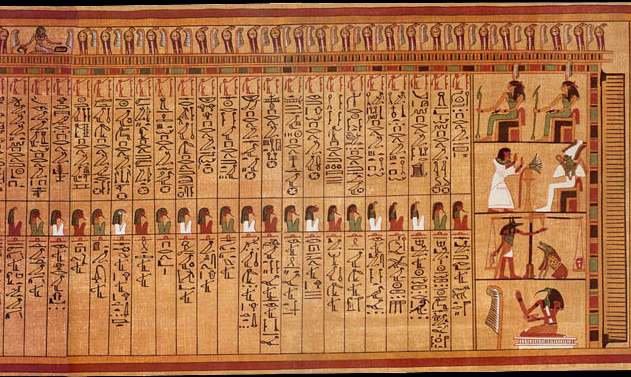
Papyrus of Ani: some of the 42 Judges of Maat are visible, seated and in small size

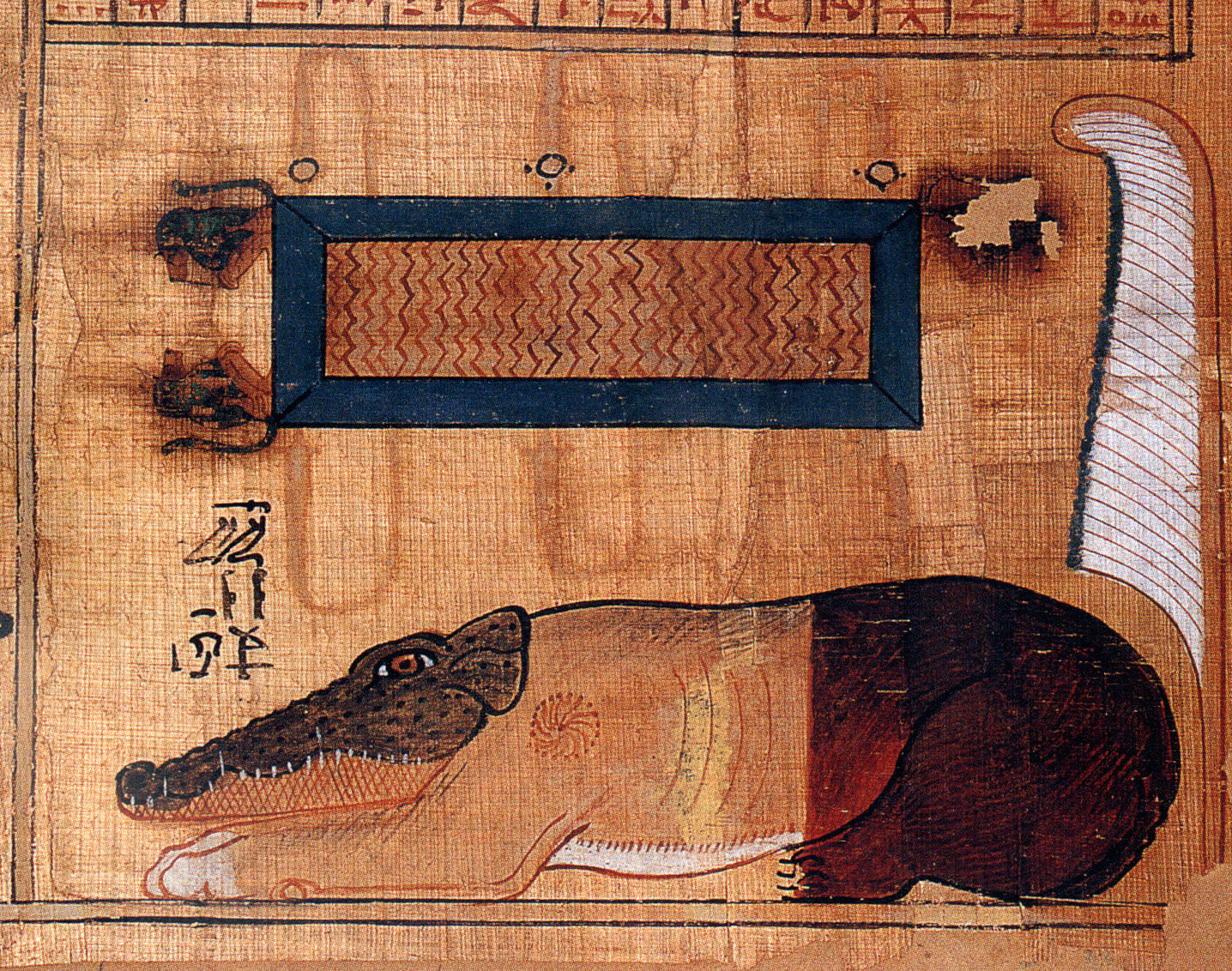
Ammit "Devourer of the Dead", and (above) the lake of fire guarded by baboons, from the papyrus of Nebqed (18th Dynasty, ca. 1391-1353 BCE)

The deceased's first task was to correctly address each of the forty-two Assessors of Maat by name, while reciting the sins they did not commit during their lifetime. This process allowed the dead to demonstrate that they knew each of the judges’ names or Ren and established that they were pure, and free of sin. After confirming that they were sinless, the deceased was presented with the balance that was used to weigh their heart against the feather of Maat. Anubis was the god often seen administering this test. If the deceased's heart balanced with the feather of Maat, Thoth would record the result and they would be presented to Osiris, who admitted them into the Sekhet-Aaru. However, if their heart was heavier than the feather, it was to be devoured by the Goddess Ammit, permanently destroying the soul of the deceased, ceasing to exist.

== Lake of fire ==
Fiery rivers and lakes in the underworld are mentioned in works such as the Coffin Texts and the Book of the Dead. Around their edges sit flaming braziers or baboons. Ra would pass through this lake on his journey through the Duat, renewing his boat. Chapter 126 of the Book of the Dead is associated with this vignette and the text is addressed to the "four baboons who sit in the prow of the Barque of Re." The lake was one of the dangers encountered on the journey through the Duat and had a dual nature. The baboons who guarded the pool were a force that could refresh and protect the deceased if they knew the correct recitation or destroy them if they did not. In the 21st Dynasty, human figures are depicted within the lakes. These represent enemies of the king or gods and their inclusion within the pools ensures their permanent destruction. In this way, the deceased could avoid meeting a similar fate, and be victorious over the forces of chaos like Ra. Am-heh, whose name means "devourer of millions" or "eater of eternity", is a hunting dog headed god from the underworld who lived in a lake of fire.

== Rebirth ==
There were numerous ways for Egyptians to secure their fate. Many of the actions Egyptian people took after death were to influence the god's decision in allowing for another life.

After judgement, entities were thought to return to the Mother Goddess' womb. During this stage, the soul meets its former body that is restored. To demonstrate, in the Book of Dead there is a series of lines that read as follows, "I unite your limbs, I hold your discharges together, I surround your flesh, I drive away the fluids of your decay, I sweep away your bꜣw, I wipe away your tears, I heal all your limbs, each being united with the other; I surround you with the work of the weaving goddess, I complete you and form you as Re." The belief continues as the nude being approaches the Goddess and enters her womb as her son. To compare, this dogma is deeply related to the birth of the sun god Ra, who enters the goddess's womb every night, and is reborn as the sun rises. Ra's relation to the afterlife is very connected through the religious components that justify the rising and setting of the sun.

Ultimately, the immortality desired by ancient Egyptians was reflected in endless lives. By doing worthy deeds in their current life, they would be granted a second life for all of eternity.

== Gender ==
According to Egyptologist Kathlyn M. Cooney, ancient Egyptian women were forced to redefine their gender by encompassing more masculine features. Osiris, who was the ultimate ruler of the underworld, was applauded for his incredible superiority as a result of his virility. Additionally, the overall theme associated with gods connected their male attributes to resurrection, and goddesses were much more vigilant. This ideology was conspired from original doctrines, which denoted the overall creator a male. Statues and other forms of display made significant notice of their creator's masculine qualities, more specifically pointing out his erect penis. Therefore, to appease their god's preferences women's tombs and coffins displayed male qualities. Examples of male modifications included name combinations, in which women engraved "Osiris" before their own name on their coffins. This demonstrated the collaboration of women with a god who was capable of rebirth, because alone their gender restricted them.

== Sekhet-Aaru ==
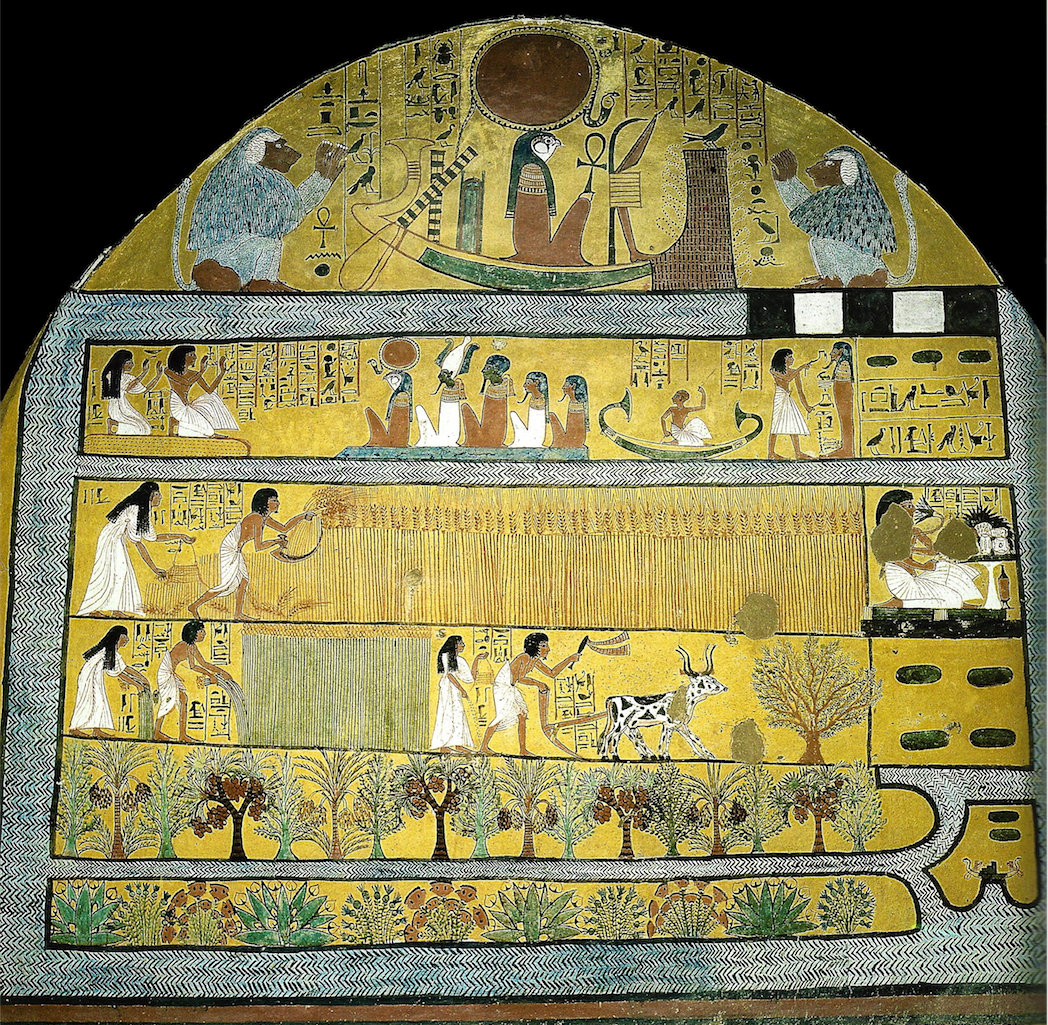
Painting of Aaru in the tomb of Sennedjem in Deir el-Medina.

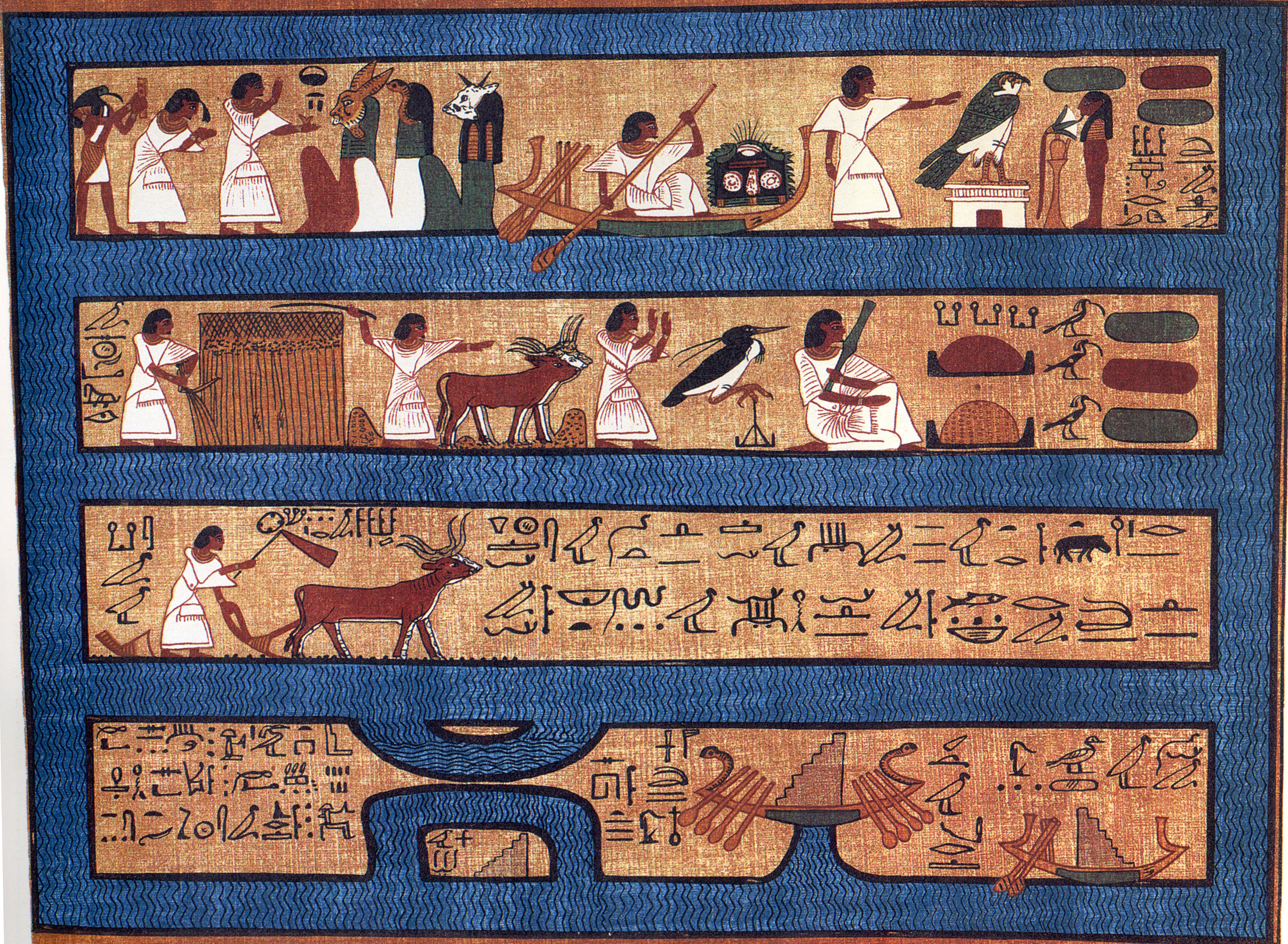
Depiction of the "Field of Reeds" within the Papyrus of Ani, currently at the British Museum.

Sekhet-Aaru, the "Field of Reeds", was the final destination for all souls who had been granted rebirth. This concept evolved in the Fifth Dynasty. Sekhet-Aaru was essentially thought to be paradise and encompassed this visualization. The Field of Reeds was visualized as a very lush region, filled with waterfalls among other natural wonders. Egyptian images, such as the Papyrus of Nebseni, depicted the land as being divided into numerous sections. Each division was imagined to resemble island structures, in which travel by boat is necessary.

Those who were granted access to the Field of Reeds included both gods and righteous souls. The fertility of the land was greatly emphasized as this possessed two of the major rewards in obtaining immortality: access to the Nile, and the ability to farm foods. As a result, the deceased ate and drank the same delicacies devoured by their gods. In turn, this promoted the belief that by obtaining immortality, individuals also accumulated aspects that resembled gods. Additionally, a third notable honor of residing in Sekhet-Aaru was the means of communication. The deceased were able to convey thoughts to one another, the gods, and those they had previously lost.

== See also ==
- Ancient Egyptian religion
- Ancient Egyptian conception of the soul
- Ancient Egyptian funerary practices
