= Ancient Egyptian funerary texts =

Collection of ancient Egyptian religious texts

The literature that makes up the ancient Egyptian funerary texts is a collection of religious documents that were used in ancient Egypt, usually to help the spirit of the concerned person to be preserved in the afterlife.

They evolved over time, beginning with the Pyramid Texts in the Old Kingdom through the Coffin Texts of the Middle Kingdom and into several books, most famously the Book of the Dead, in the New Kingdom and later times.

== Old Kingdom ==
The funerary texts of the Old Kingdom were initially reserved for the king only. Towards the end of the period, the texts appeared in the tombs of royal wives.

== Middle Kingdom ==
These are a collection of ancient Egyptian funerary spells written on coffins beginning in the First Intermediate Period. Nearly half of the spells in the Coffin Texts derive from those in the Pyramid Texts.

== New Kingdom ==
- Book of the Dead
- Amduat
- Spell of the Twelve Caves
- The Book of Gates
- Book of the Netherworld
- Book of Caverns
- Book of the Earth
- Litany of Re

=== Late New Kingdom ===
- Books of the Sky

After the Amarna Period, a new set of funerary texts began to be used. These centre on representations of Nut, the sky goddess. They represent the nighttime journey of the sun into and through her body, with her giving birth to the rejuvenated sun in the morning. From the tomb of Ramesses IV onwards two of these Books of the Sky were usually placed next to each other on the ceiling of royal tombs.

- Book of Nut
- Book of the Day
- Book of the Night
- Book of the Heavenly Cow

== Late Period ==
- Books of Breathing

== Ptolemaic ==
- Book of Traversing Eternity
