= KV1 =

Tomb of Ramesses VII in Egypt

- Burial site of Ramesses VII
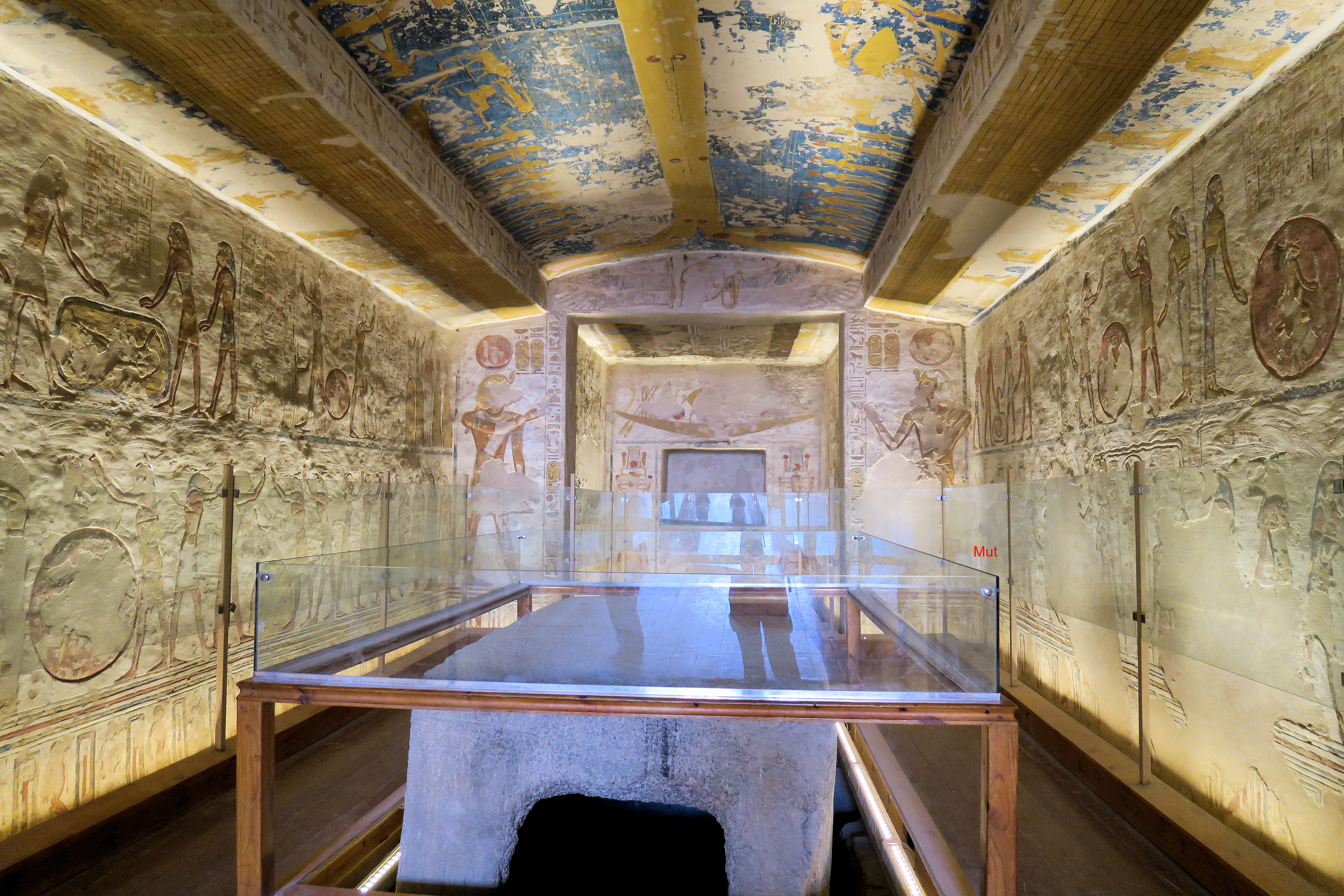
- KV1 sarcophagus and tomb reliefs

- Location within Egypt
- Coordinates: 25°44′32.4″N 32°36′06.7″E
- Location: East Valley of the Kings
- Discovered: Open in antiquity
- Excavated by: Edwin Brock (1984–1985)
- Decoration: Book of Gates; Book of Caverns; Book of the Earth
- Layout: Straight
- Next → KV2

Tomb KV1, located in the Valley of the Kings in Egypt, was used for the burial of Pharaoh Ramesses VII of the Twentieth Dynasty. Although it has been open since antiquity, it was only properly investigated and cleared by Edwin Brock in 1984 and 1985. The single corridor tomb is located in Luxor's West Bank, and is small in comparison to other tombs of the Twentieth Dynasty.

== Tomb layout ==
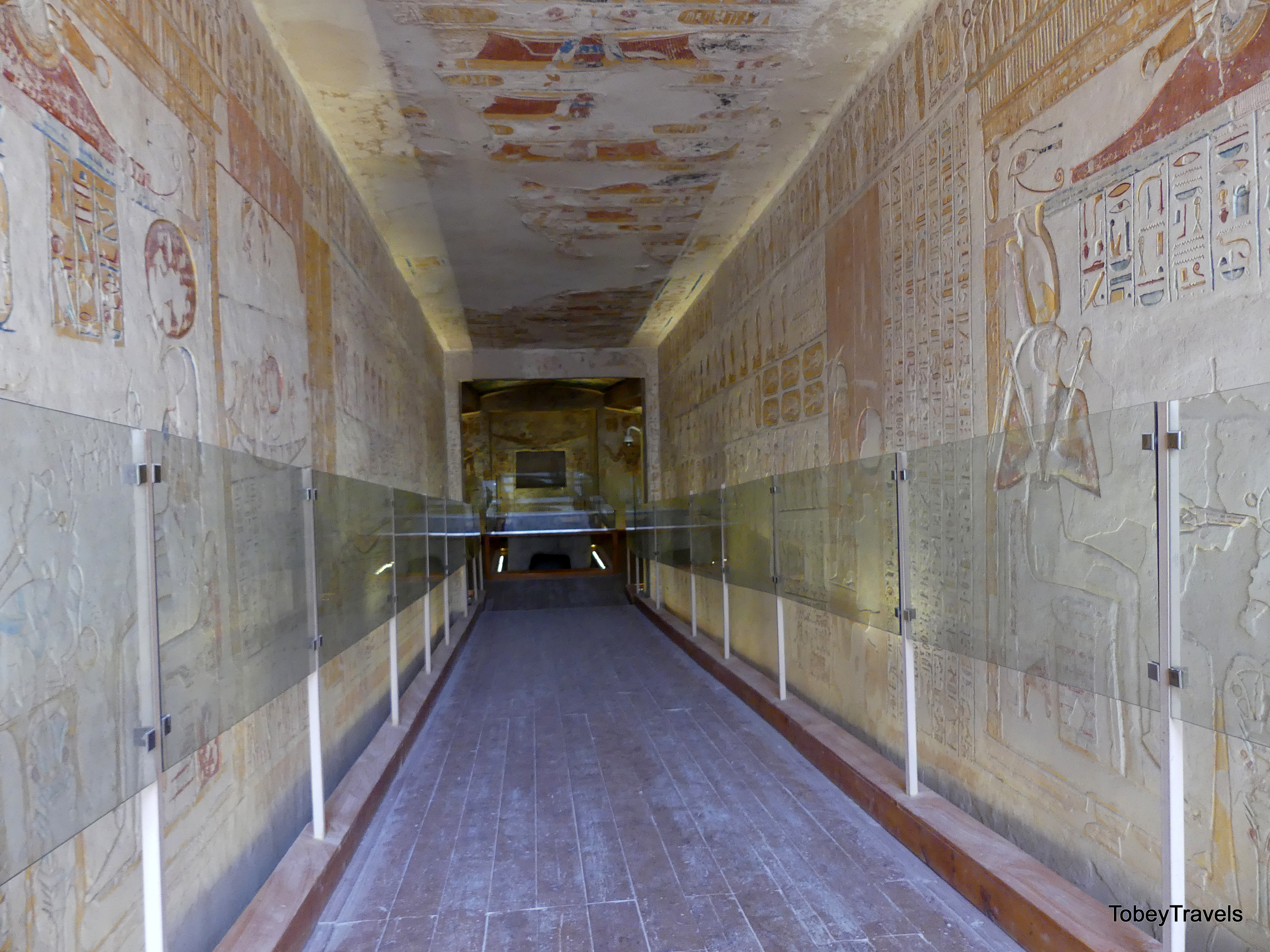
Tomb Corridor B of KV1

Typical of tombs from this period, KV1 is laid out along a straight axis. The successors of Ramesses III constructed tombs that had followed this pattern and were all decorated in much the same manner as each other. It consists of four major parts: the entrance, a passageway, the burial chamber containing the sarcophagus, and a smaller room at the end.

Ramesses VII was in the seventh year of his reign when he died. There is evidence that the burial chamber was expanded from its original design as a corridor, and work on a subsequent room at the end of the tomb was halted.

The tomb itself consists of 7 main sections labeled A-K with two letters that are used to label a section twice. KV1 consists of one entryway and three gates that are labeled gates B, J and K. The tomb does not have staircases but rather descends and ascends with the use of ramps. The tomb of KV1 was also one of the latest tombs to be cut inside of the Wadi.

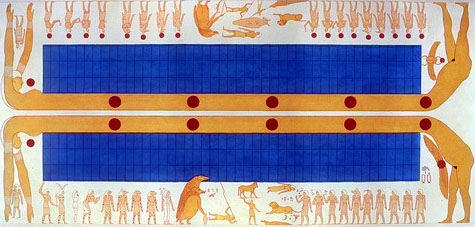
Double image of the sky goddess Nut on the ceiling of KV1

The decoration within the passageway of the tomb contains illustrations from the Book of Gates, the Book of Caverns as well as the Book of the Earth. The walls of the burial chamber are decorated with extracts from the Book of the Earth. In terms of style and themes it closely follows that of its immediate predecessor, Ramesses VI's KV9, though the ceiling within the burial chamber contains a double image of the sky goddess Nut, reflecting a style used in tomb paintings used by pharaohs of the previous dynasty.

Within the burial chamber a depression has been cut into the rock, with an inverted box of stone shaped roughly like a cartouche placed over it. This is the last known example of a sarcophagus placed in a royal tomb in the Valley of the Kings, all subsequent burials consisting of deeper pits which were covered by a lid. The tomb was robbed in antiquity, and the mummy presumably lost, though four cups inscribed with the pharaoh's name were found in the "royal cache" in DB320 along with the remains of other pharaohs.

== Visits in antiquity ==
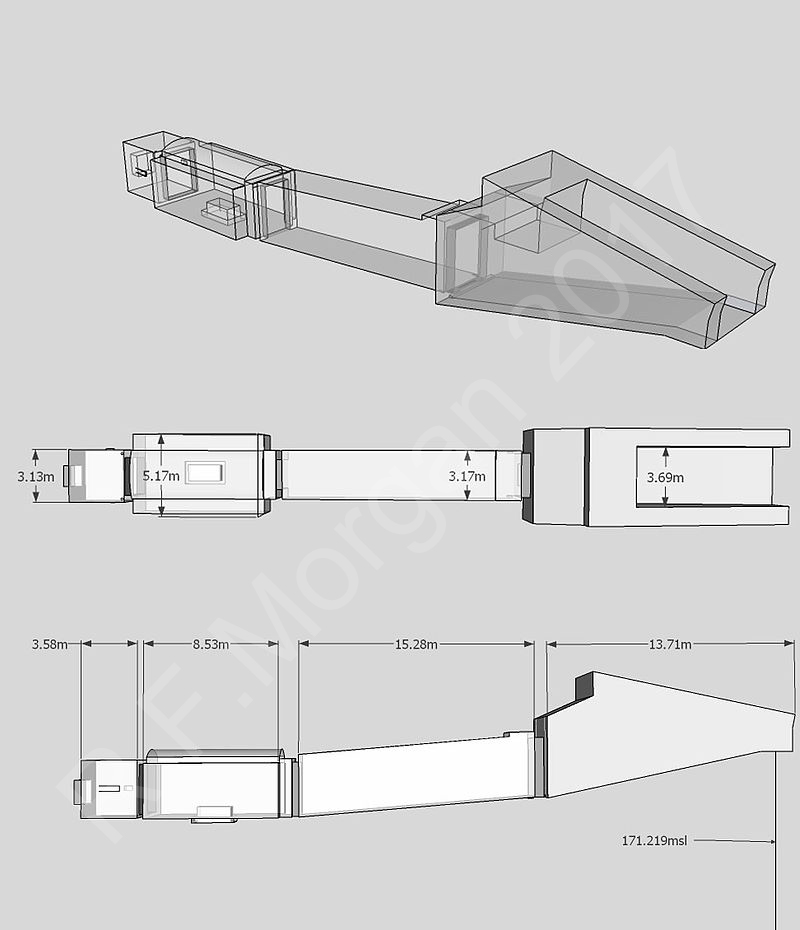
Isometric, plan and elevation images of KV1

The tomb was one of at least eleven tombs that were open to early travelers. As evidence of this, 132 individual graffitis left by Ancient Greek and Roman visitors have been counted throughout KV1. Later, the tomb was used as a dwelling by Coptic monks.

Early European visitors to the area included Richard Pococke, who visited KV1 and designated it "Tomb A" in his Observations of Egypt, published in 1743.

The savants accompanying Napoleon's campaign in Egypt surveyed the Valley of the Kings and designated KV1 as "1er Tombeau" ("1st Tomb") in their list.

== Recent archeological work ==
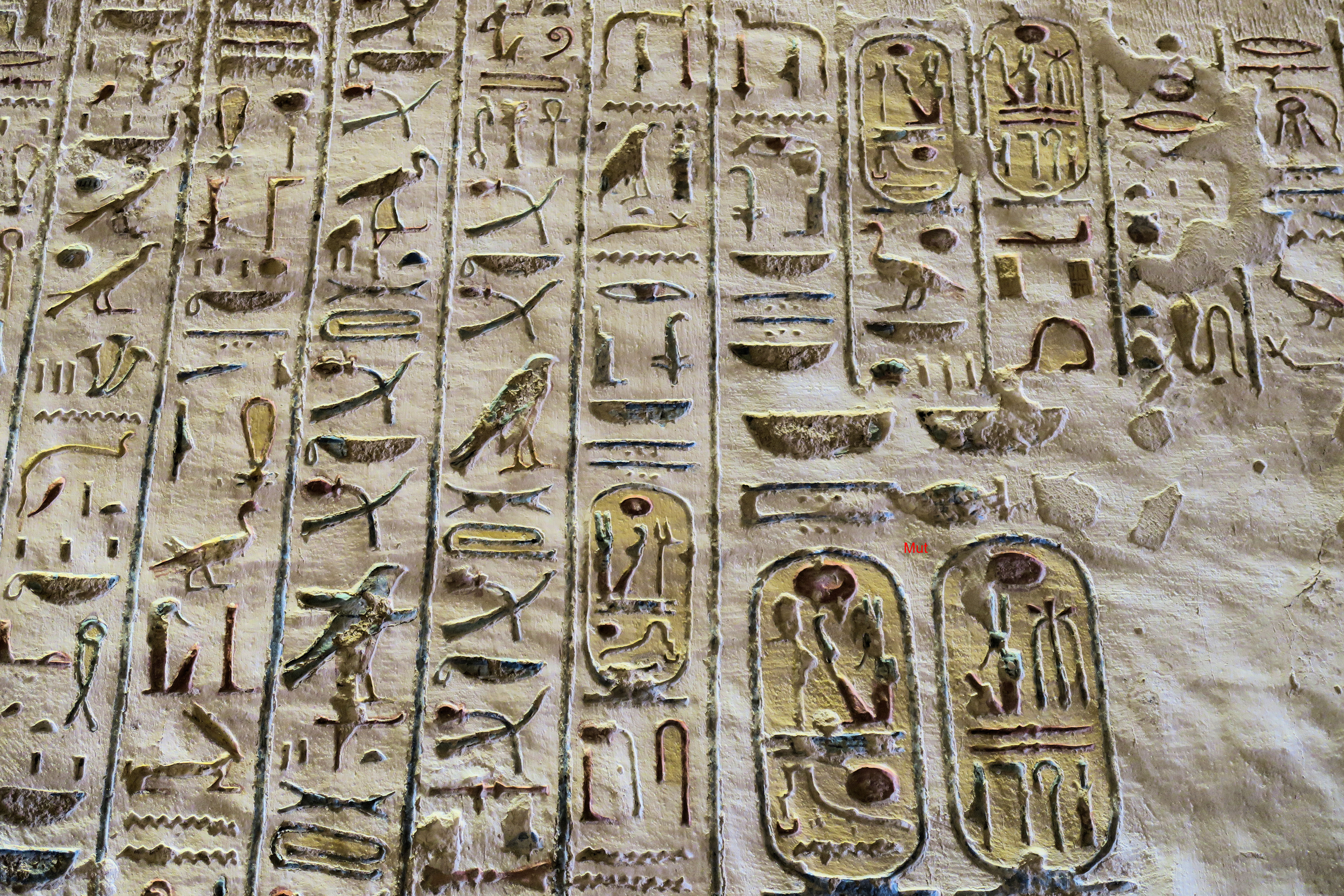
Carved wall reliefs of Ramessess VII's KV1 tomb

Though not documented, the tomb was cleared in the 1950s. Starting in 1983, funded by the Royal Ontario Museum, Edwin Brock thoroughly excavated the burial chamber floor, followed a decade later by an excavation of the tomb's entrance. In 1994, the Supreme Council of Antiquities cleaned the walls and repaired cracks with plaster. In doing so, they covered over graffiti that had been left there in ancient times.

Some of Brock's findings included fragments of wood, calcite and faience shabtis, ostraca decorated with sketches presumably by the tomb's artists, a floral garland and numerous contemporaneous pottery shards.

== Literature ==
- Hornung, E., et al. Zwei Ramessidische Königsgräber: Ramses IV. und Ramses VII, 1990, Mainz am Rhein, P. von Zabern.
- Reeves, N & Wilkinson, R.H. The Complete Valley of the Kings, 1996, Thames and Hudson, London
- Siliotti, A. Guide to the Valley of the Kings and to the Theban Necropolises and Temples, 1996, A.A. Gaddis, Cairo
