= KV 1 =

KV 1 may refer to:

- KV 1, designations for the works of two classical music composers:
  - six works in the original Köchel Verzeichnis by Wolfgang Amadeus Mozart
  - a keyboard sonata by Domenico Scarlatti
- KV-1, the first model of the Kliment Voroshilov tank, deployed by the Soviets in World War II
- KV1, the tomb of Pharaoh Ramesses VII in the Valley of the Kings, Egypt
- KV1, a variant of the Jackson King V electric guitar
