= Books of Breathing =

Ancient Egyptian funerary texts

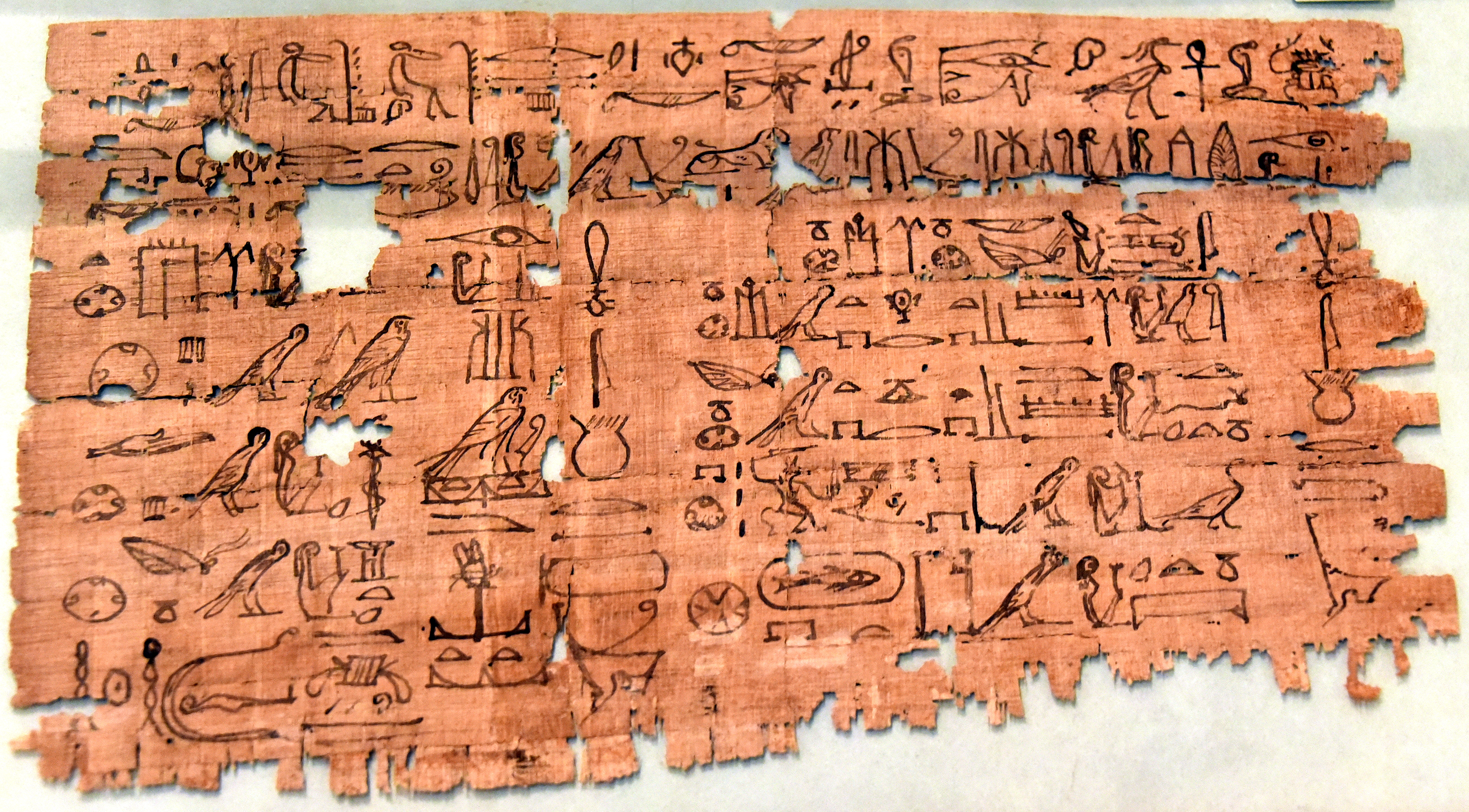
Papyrus with hieratic, part of Egypt's Books of Breathing, probably from Thebes. Dated to 323–30 BC (Ptolemaic Kingdom). Currently on display at Germany's Neues Museum.

The Books of Breathing (Arabic: كتاب التنفس Kitāb al-Tanafus) are several ancient Egyptian funerary texts, intended to enable deceased people to continue existing in the afterlife. The earliest known copy dates to circa 350 BC. Other copies come from the Ptolemaic Kingdom and Roman Egypt, as late as the 2nd century AD. It is a simplified form of the Book of the Dead.

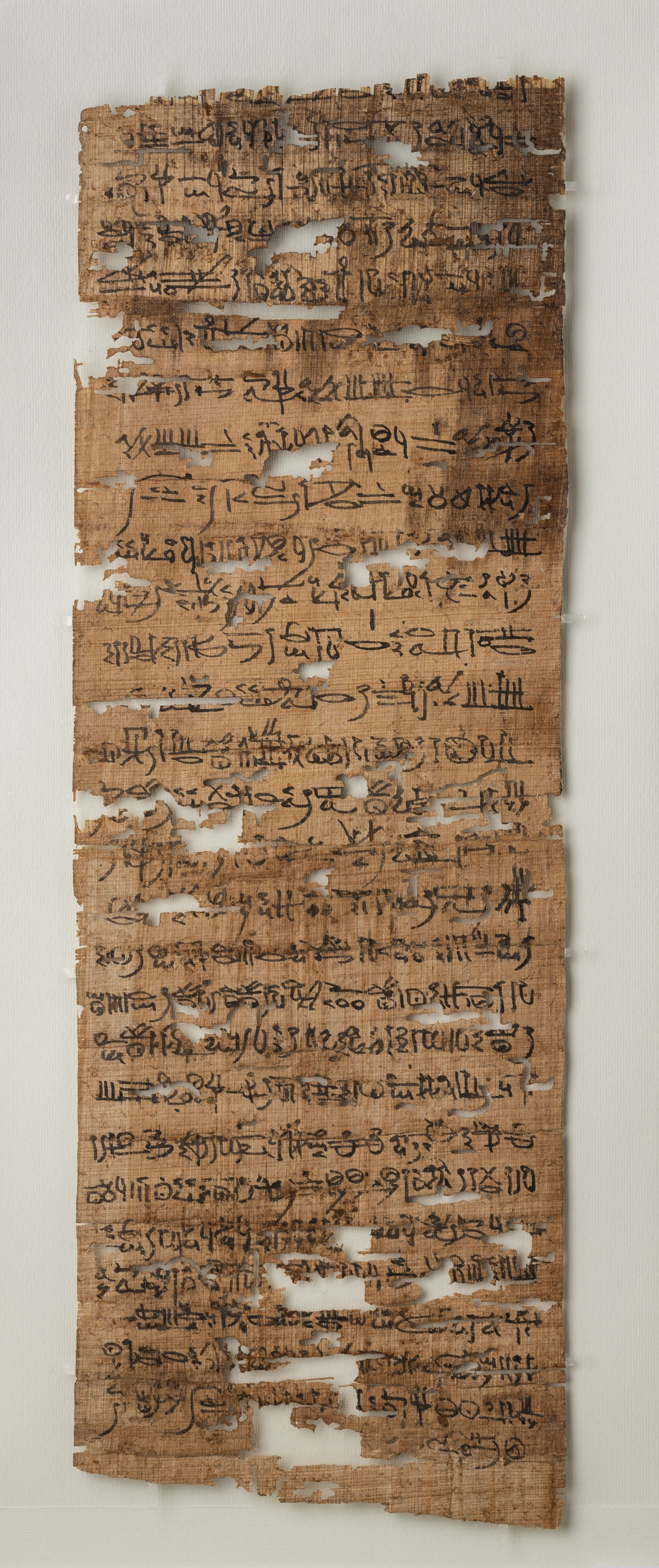
Book of Breathings written in Hieratic, Roman Egypt, 1st-2nd century. Museo Egizio, Torino.

They were originally named "The Letter for Breathing Which Isis Made for Her Brother Osiris, The First Letter for Breathing" and "The Second Letter for Breathing" and have appeared in many varying copies, often leading scholars to confuse them with each other. Their titles use the word "breathing" as a metaphorical term for all of the aspects of life that the deceased hoped to experience again in the afterlife. The texts exhort various Egyptian gods to accept the deceased into their company.

Some of the papyri that the American religious leader Joseph Smith (1805–1844) used to create the Book of Abraham are parts of the Books of Breathing.

== See also ==
- Ancient Egyptian funerary texts
  - Book of the Dead
  - Breathing Permit of Hôr
- Ancient Egyptian religion
  - Ancient Egyptian afterlife beliefs
