= Book of Caverns =

Ancient Egyptian funerary text

The Book of Caverns is an Ancient Egyptian underworld book from the New Kingdom. The Book of Caverns originated in the 13th century BC in the Ramesside Period. Like all other underworld books, it is found in mortuary contexts such as tombs or temples. The Book of Caverns describes the journey of the Egyptian sun god, Ra, through the twelve caverns of the Duat (the Egyptian underworld). This book highlights the interactions of Ra with the residents of the underworld, and how Ra either punishes or rewards them for their actions. It also focuses on the rebirth of Ra in the morning through his merging with the Egyptian god of the dead, Osiris.

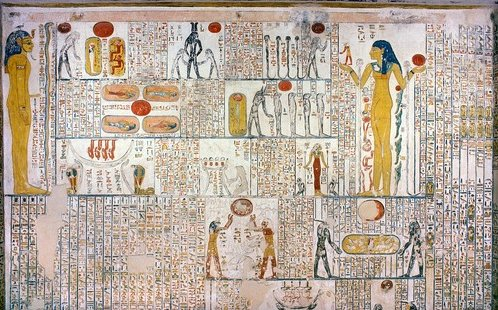
Book of Caverns, fifth division. Scene from tomb of Ramses VI. (KV9, chamber E, right wall).

== History ==
The earliest known version of this work is on the left hand wall of the Osireion: a mortuary temple to Seti I in Abydos. This inscription of the Book of Caverns is almost complete, with only its upper register damaged. It is also found inscribed on the tombs in the Valley of the Kings from the 19th and 20th dynasties. It appears in more private, non-royal, mortuary contexts in the later periods during the New Kingdom.

The first and only almost complete copy of this book in the Valley of the Kings is the version in the tomb of Ramesses VI. Here it appears opposite the Book of Gates in the front of the tomb, similar to the layout in the Osireion. The passages of the book were written all over the walls of the tomb, completely covering it in text.

=== Contemporary history and scholarship ===
The Book of Caverns was first brought into contemporary historiography by Jean François Champollion. Champollion described the inscriptions and images of the Book of Caverns on the walls of the tomb of Ramesses VI in his 13th letter from Thebes. At this point, Champollion did not have a name for the Book of Caverns. He published his findings in the 1844 edition of Notice Descriptions. The same year this journal was published Champollion also published a manuscript detailing the inscriptions of the book he found in other tombs across the Valley of the Kings.

The title of "The Book of Caverns" was not assigned to these inscriptions until Eugène Jean Baptiste Lefebvre referred to it by this name in volume 3 of Les Hypogées Royaux de Thèbes, which was published in 1889.

The copy of the Book of Caverns in the Osireion was uncovered by archaeologists Margaret Murray and Flinders Petrie, who were excavating the site in 1902 through 1903. The Book of Caverns was found directly across from the Book of Gates within the entrance passage on the left wall. Murray published her findings, initially interpreting the Book of Caverns to be a section of the Book of Gates.

In 1954, Alexandre Piankoff published an English translated copy of the Book of Caverns, containing both text and images from the reliefs of the Book of Caverns. This book, along with several articles Piankoff published between 1942 and 1958, provides the basis for current English scholarship relating to the Book of Caverns.

== Structure ==
The Book of Caverns is told using images and text, some sections containing only text, others text and images, and some with just images. In the different scenes, text tells of Ra's conversations with deities in the underworld.

Along the walls of the tombs where the Book of Caverns is displayed, the book is divided into 17 sections consisting of six main divisions, several litanies, and the final scene of Ra's rebirth. Unlike other underworld books, its six sections do not correspond with the hours of the night or the twelve caverns. Due to this fact, the book is often misinterpreted to depict the underworld with six caverns, rather than twelve. These six sections are divided into two parts with three tableaus each, plus a final tableau depicting Ra's rebirth.

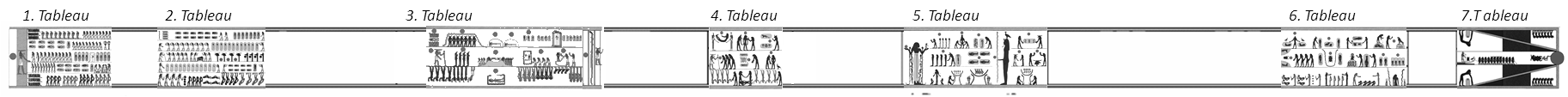
Schema of the Book of Caverns, from Daniel A. Werning.

== Content ==
Like other Great Underworld Books, the Book of Caverns tells the journey of Ra as he travels through the 12 hours of the night in the Underworld. The caverns of the underworld act as both a place of punishment to souls who displeased Ra in life, and a sanctuary to the righteous souls. The enemies of Ra, who displeased the gods, are identifiable through their depiction of being either decapitated or with their hands behind their back.

The Book of Caverns also gives some hints on the imagined topographical structure of the underworld, although the specifics of this structure of the underworld is still unknown.

=== First division ===
This division begins the Book of Caverns with Ra's descent into the Underworld. In the upper register of this section, Ra convinces the serpentine doorkeepers of the underworld to let him through the doors and into the underworld. Also in the upper register, the corpse of Osiris is displayed in multiple pieces, emphasizing at this point in the book how Ra and Osiris are separate. Additionally, the Ennead guardian deities are depicted in this section, accompanying Ra to the Western Necropolis.

=== Second division ===
This division contains ten scenes, further showing Ra convincing the serpentine doorkeepers to let him into the underworld. The death of Osiris is depicted in this section.

=== Third division ===
This section contains thirteen scenes where Ra enters into the underworld after being let through the doors by the serpentine doorkeepers. This is the first division when Osiris and Ra symbolically start to unify. This unification is depicted through Ra's sun disk being paired on top of the illustration of Osiris. This unification begins around the third hour of the night in Ra's journey, and continues to be represented throughout the rest of the book, until Ra's rebirth.

=== Fourth division ===
The nine scenes in this section depict Ra along with several other gods, including Isis, Nephtys, Anubis, and Horus. Divisions three and four especially focus on the punishment of the damned: deceased souls who displeased the gods.

=== Fifth division ===
This section begins Ra's rebirth. The inclusion of the goddess Nut, Ra's mother, in this division symbolically showcases the start of his rebirth. Within this section it also depicts several deities alongside the reassembled body of Osiris.

=== Sixth division ===
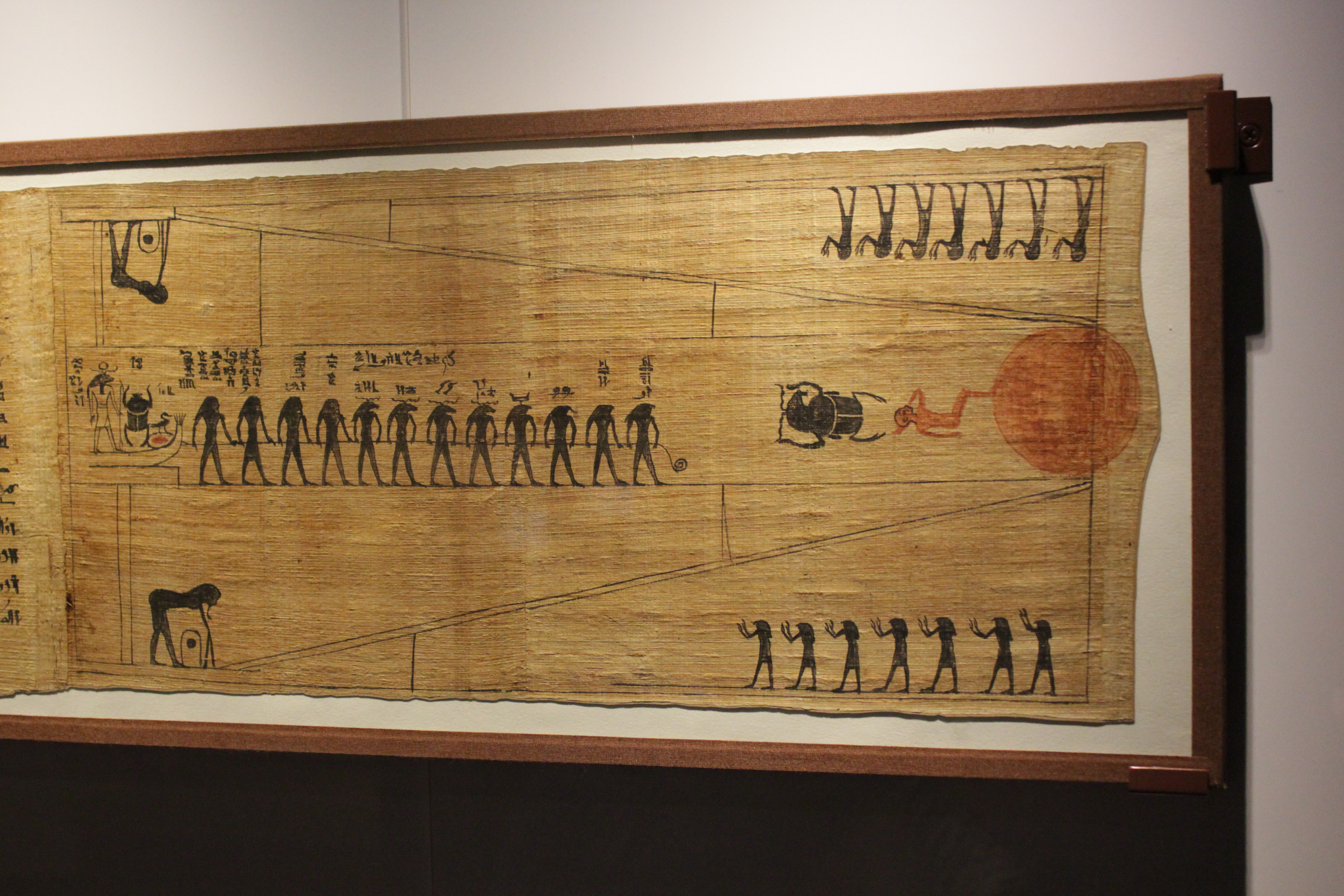
From the Book of Caverns Division 6, depicting Ra's rebirth on Papyrus. Displayed in the Western Australian Museum in Perth, Australia.

The last section before Ra's rebirth, division six depicts Ra beginning the process of rebirth. It highlights scarab beetles and a sun disk emerging from mounds in the ground, representing Ra and Osiris. Further scenes show a mummified deity, as Osiris is usually shown, with a rams-head, as Ra is typically depicted. This demonstrates the merging of Osiris and Ra in this scene, shortly before Ra's final rebirth.

=== Final rebirth tableau ===
This section showcases the finale of Ra's rebirth, as he emerges in the morning. Across this tableau, Ra is depicted in his various forms, as a child, scarab beetle, and ram-headed deity.

== Translation ==
The first translation of some sentences of the Book of Caverns from the tomb of Ramesses VI were given by Ippolito Rosellini in 1836. Not much later, Jean François Champollion wrote about the Book of Caverns from this tomb providing some translations in his 1844 manuscript.

However, scholars didn't show much interest in the book until about a century later when the second complete version of the text was discovered in the Osireion. Between 1942 and 1945, Alexandre Piankoff published a French translation of the book, followed by a translation into German by Erik Hornung in 1972. A second English translation is a translation of Hornung's book from German into English.

The latest translation was published by the German scholar Daniel Werning, based on a new text critical edition.

== Analysis and interpretations in scholarship ==
Among historians there is some debate as to what the primary purpose of the Book of Caverns was in ancient times. While some argue the key focus was to showcase the unity of Ra and Osiris during Ra's journey through the caverns, others interpret it to be focused on showing the punishment of the enemies of these gods. While both aspects are prominent in the book, it is debated which was central to the reasoning when the Ancient Egyptians were creating the Book of Caverns.

There has been several misinterpretations of this book that have since been disproved upon further examination of the Book of Caverns. The Book of Caverns was originally interpreted to be sections in other underworld books. First, Margaret Murray originally believed it to be a part of the Book of Gates. It is also sometimes theorized to be in chapter 168 of the Book of the Dead. Additionally, due to its layout, consisting of six sections rather than the typical twelve of other underworld books, it is often misinterpreted to only have six caverns, which is not the case.

== Location ==
Archeologists have found the Book of Caverns in eight different sites, but only three of these locations contain complete versions of it: the Osireion, and the tombs of Ramesses VI and Ramesses IX.

Often, the Book of Caverns decorates the burial chamber in tombs, along with the Book of Gates and Book of Earth. Tombs of the New Kingdom, where the Book of Caverns is found, often mimic the layout of Ra's journey through the twelve caverns in their architecture. Therefore, the Book of Caverns being placed in the burial chamber, the deepest section of the tomb, is theorized to symbolically represent the end of Ra's journey, and the moment he unites with Osiris in the form of the buried king's mummy.

== Attestations ==
Today we know of 13 text witnesses of the Book of Caverns: The table below shows the location, coverage and dating of each of these text witnesses.

Text witness	Location	Coverage	Dating
Osireion of the Osiris temple in Abydos	Corridor	Complete	Late 13th century BCE
Tomb of king Ramesses IV (KV 2)	3rd corridor; annex	1st and 2nd tableau	Mid-12th century BCE
Tomb of king Ramesses VI (KV 9)	Upper part of the tomb	Nearly complete	Mid-12th century BCE
Tomb of king Ramesses VII (KV 1)	(1st) corridor	1st tableau	2nd half of 12th century BCE
Tomb of king Ramesses IX (KV 6)	1st and 2nd corridor; Sarcophagus chamber	1st-5th tableau (parts)	Late 12th century BCE
Funerary papyrus of queen Nodjmet (pBM EA 10490)		1st, 2nd, 4th, and 7th tableau (parts)	Mid-11th century BCE
Papyrus amulet of Butehamun (pTurin 1858)		One scene	Mid-11th century BCE
Mummy cartonage (Louvre [location unknown])		One scene	probably 1st millennium BCE
Tomb of maior Montuemhat (TT 34)		Probably complete (now largely destroyed)	2nd half of 7th century BCE
Tomb of the lector priest Pediamenopet (TT 33)	Rooms and corridor XVII–XIX	Complete	2nd half of 7th century BCE
Blocks from Rhoda		At least 1st and 2nd tableau	Probably 1st millennium BCE
Sarcophagus of general Petiëse (Berlin No. 29)	Lid	One scene.	c. 4th century BCE
Sarcophagus of Tjihorpto (Cairo CG 29306)	Outer surface; lid	1st, 2nd, 5th, and 6th tableau (parts)	4th century BCE
