= KV2 =

Tomb of Pharaoh Ramesses IV

- Burial site of Ramesses IV
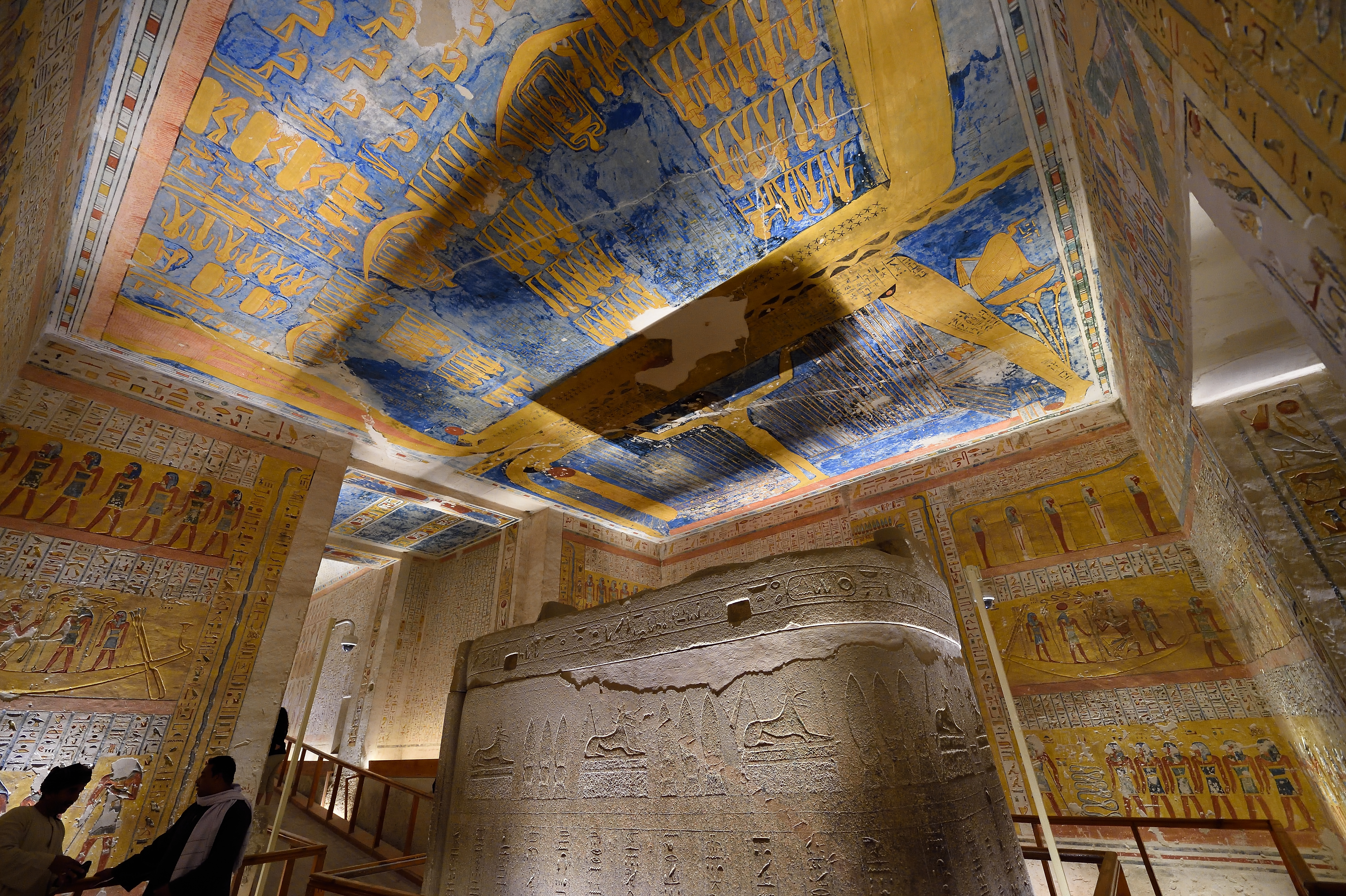

- Location within Egypt
- Coordinates: 25°44′29.2″N 32°36′07.7″E
- Location: East Valley of the Kings
- Discovered: Open since antiquity
- Excavated by: Edward R. Ayrton (1905–06); Howard Carter (1920)
- Decoration: Litany of Ra; Book of Caverns; Book of the Dead; Book of Amduat; Book of the Heavens
- Layout: Straight axis
- ← Previous; KV1 Next → KV3

Tomb KV2, found in the Valley of the Kings, is the tomb of Ramesses IV, and is located low in the main valley, between KV7 and KV1. It has been open since antiquity and contains a large amount of graffiti.

== Contemporary plans of the tomb ==
There are two known plans of the tomb's layout contemporary to its construction. One on papyrus (now located at the Egyptian Museum in Turin) provides a detailed depiction of the tomb at 1:28 scale. All of the passages and chambers are present, with measurements written in hieratic script. The papyrus plan also depicts the pharaoh's sarcophagus surrounded by four concentric sets of shrines, the same layout of shrines that were found intact within Tutankhamun's tomb. The other plan of the tomb was found inscribed on a slab of limestone not far from the tomb's entrance, and is a rough layout of the tomb depicting the location of its doors. The latter plan may have just been a "workman's doodle" but the papyrus plan almost certainly had a deeper ritual meaning, and may have been used to consecrate the tomb after it was built.

KV2 plan on ancient papyrus found in the tomb. Museo Egizio, Turin (C. 1885).

== Tomb layout ==
A hieratic ostracon has been discovered mentioning the initiation of the tomb, its location selected by the local governor and two of the pharaoh's chief attendants in the second year of his reign. Ramesses IV ascended the throne late in life, and to ensure that he would have a sizable tomb (during what would be a relatively brief reign of about six years), he doubled the size of the existing work gangs at Deir el-Medina to a total of 120 men. Though sizable, KV2 has been described as "simplistic" in its design and decoration. The tomb was excavated at the base of a hill on the northwest side of the Valley of the Kings.

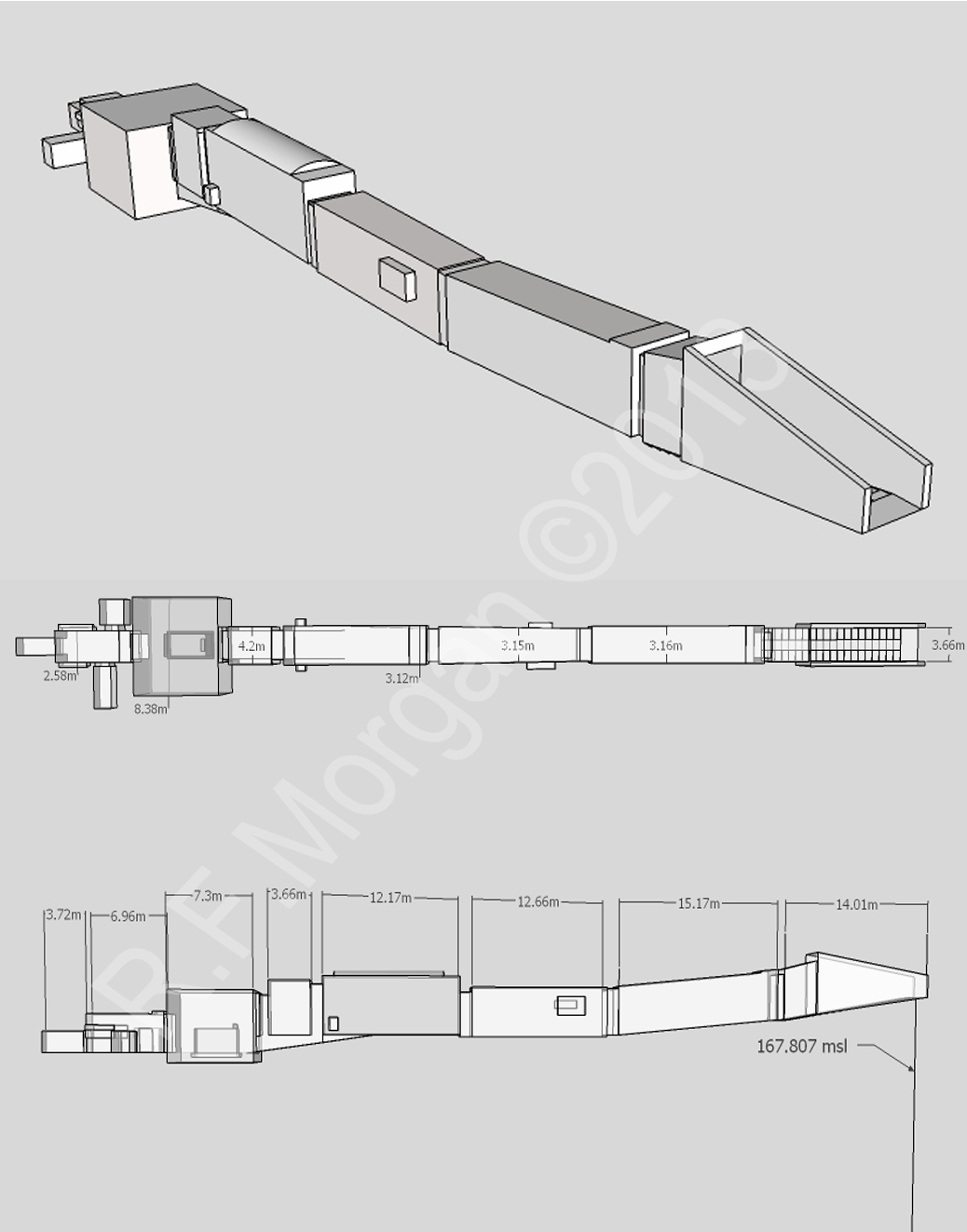
Schematic of KV2

Like other tombs of the 20th Dynasty, KV2 is laid out along a straight axis. The successors of Ramesses III from this dynasty constructed tombs that follow this pattern and most were decorated in a similar manner to one other.

The tomb has a maximum length of 88.66 m and consists of three slowly descending corridors labeled B, C, and D. This is followed by an enlarged chamber (E), and then the burial chamber (J). Past the burial chamber lies a narrow corridor (K) flanked by three side chambers [Ka, Kb and Kc]. Based on the text of the plan of the tomb and traces of earlier work in the tomb, the plan for the tomb originally was to carve the burial chamber past corridor K while the current burial chamber was originally a pillared chamber. However, when Ramesses IV died after only reigning for six and a half years, and the need to finish the tomb for his burial became apparent, the pillared chamber was converted into a burial chamber, with the pillars removed and the floor lowered to accommodate the sarcophagus of the pharaoh.

The tomb is mostly intact and is decorated with scenes from the Litany of Ra, Book of Caverns, Book of the Dead, Book of Amduat and the Book of the Heavens.

The sarcophagus is broken (probably in antiquity), and the mummy was relocated to the mummy cache in KV35.

== Visits in antiquity ==
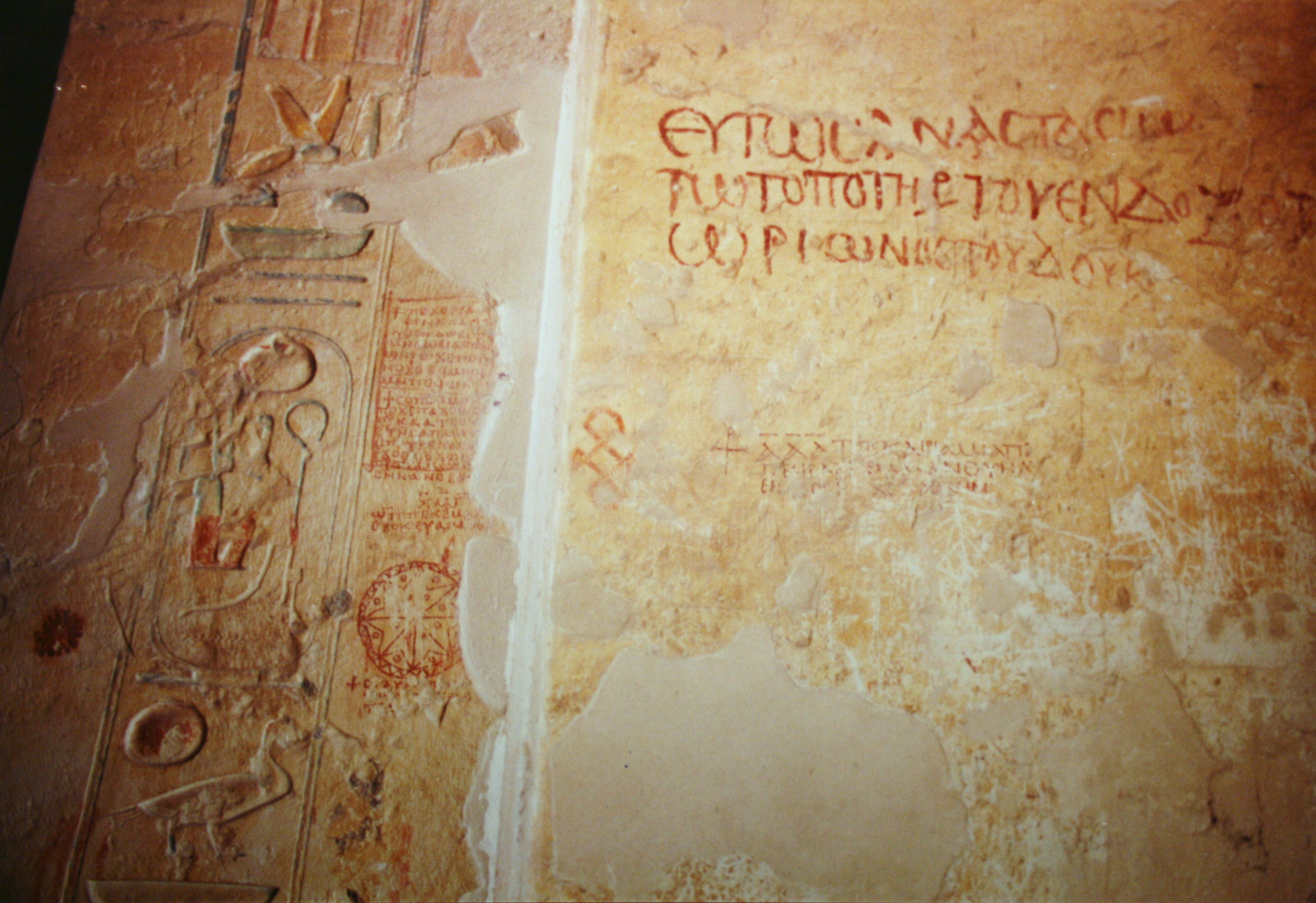
Coptic graffiti within KV2

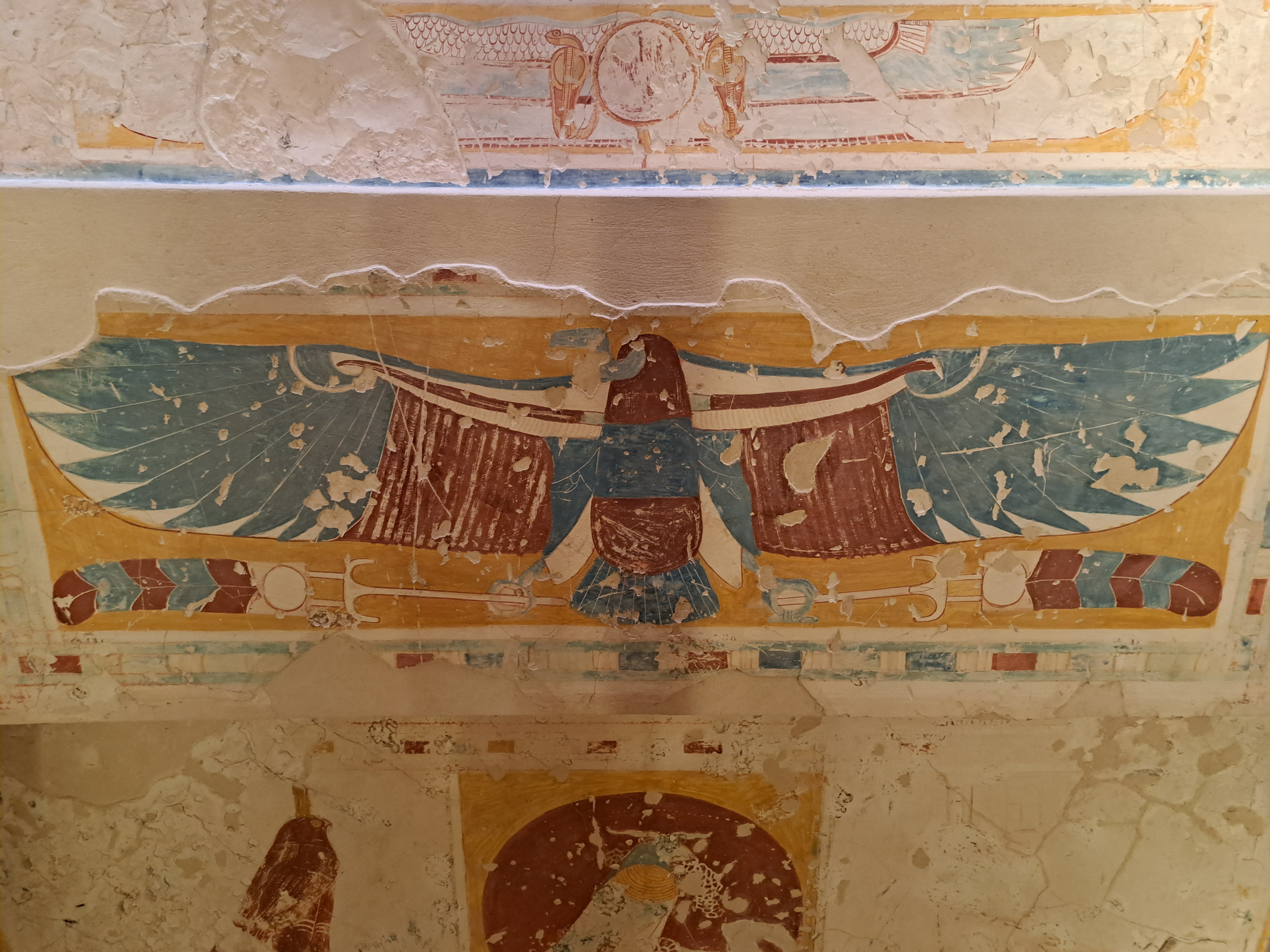
Entrance ceiling of Ramses IV tomb in the Valley of the Kings (KV2)

The tomb was one of about eleven tombs open to early travelers. KV2 contains the second-highest number of ancient graffiti within it (after KV9), with 656 individual graffiti left by both Ancient Greek and Roman visitors. This tomb also contains around 50 or so examples of Coptic graffiti, mostly sketched onto the right wall by the entranceway. The tomb was likely used as a dwelling by Coptic monks, and there are also depictions of Coptic saints and crosses on the tomb's walls.

Early European visitors to the area included Richard Pococke, who may have visited KV2 and designated it "Tomb B" in his Observations of Egypt, published in 1743.

The savants accompanying Napoleon's campaign in Egypt surveyed the Valley of the Kings and designated KV2 as "IIe Tombeau" ("2nd Tomb") in their list. Other visitors of note included James Burton, who mapped the tomb in 1825, and the Franco-Tuscan Expedition of 1828–1829, who conducted an epigraphic survey of the tomb's inscriptions.

== Modern archeological work ==
Archeologist Edward Ayrton excavated the entranceway to the tomb during 1905/1906, followed by Howard Carter in 1920. Both of them found remnants of the materials which had originally come from inside the tomb, such as shabtis, numerous ostraca and fragments of wood, glass and Faience.

== Notes ==
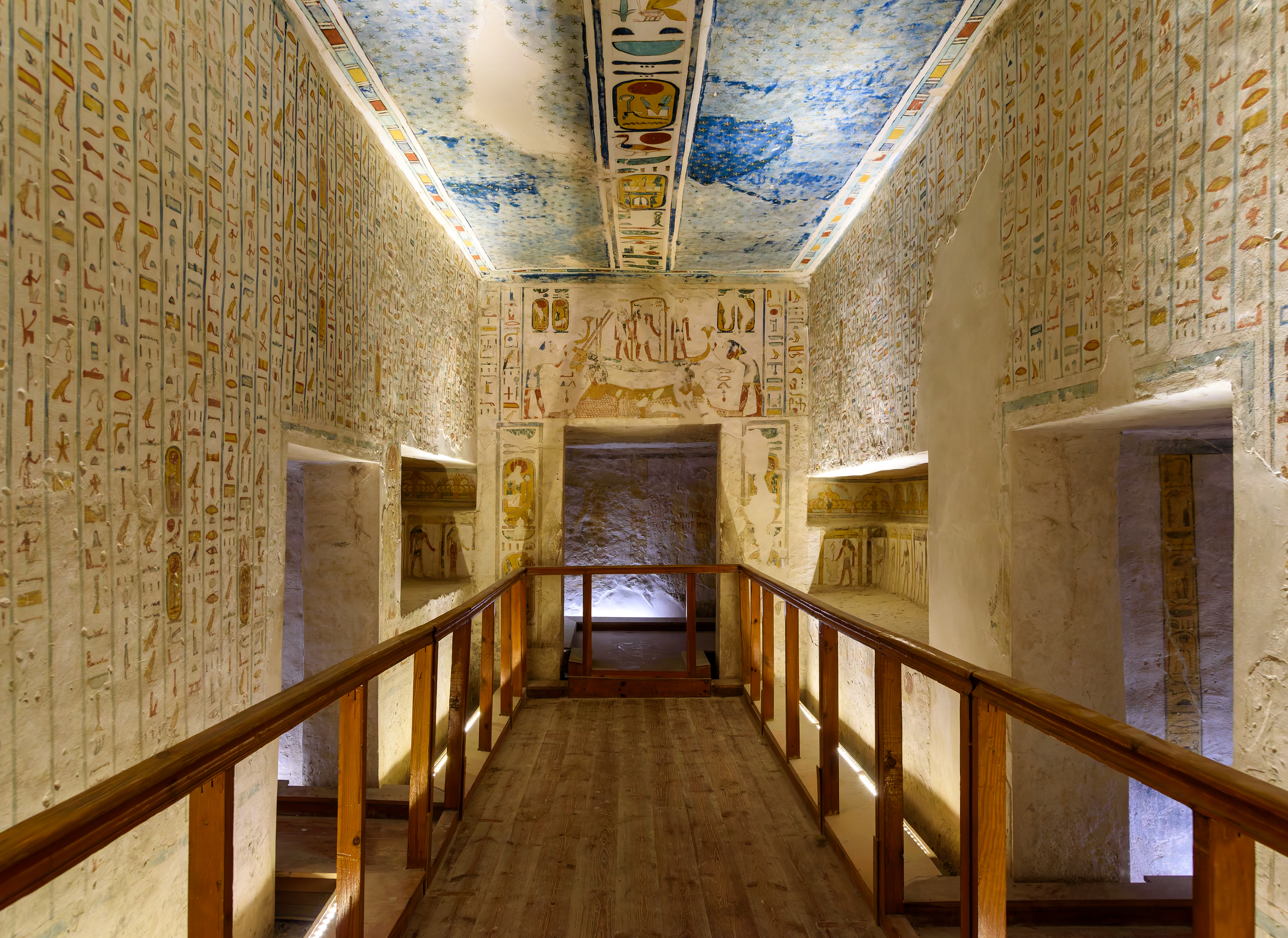
View of the corridor inside Ramesses IV's tomb
