= Butehamun =

Ancient Egyptian scribe

- Inner coffin lid of Butehamun, now in Museo Egizio, Turin
- Born: Before 1070 BC; In or around Deir el-Medina, Egypt
- Died: Before 960 BC
- Occupation: Scribe
- Years active: c. 11th century BC

b Z7 t h A D57 A24 i mn n
Butehamun
in hieroglyphs
Era: New Kingdom
(1550–1069 BC)

Butehamun (fl. 11th century BC) was an Egyptian scribe born and raised in or around Deir el-Medina during the reign of Ramesses XI, the tenth and final pharaoh of the Twentieth Dynasty of Egypt. Butehamun was the son of Thutmose (or Dhutmose) of Deir el-Medina, who was also a scribe, and a member of a family of scribes dating back to the early Twentieth Dynasty.

Under the orders of the High Priests of Amun who maintained the temple complex of Karnak in Thebes, Butehamun was involved in the relocation and reburial of royal mummies from the Valley of the Kings to the Royal Cache (TT320). Throughout his life, Butehamun earned several titles, including "Scribe of the Necropolis", "Opener of the Gates of the Necropolis", "Overseer of Works in the House of Eternity", and "Overseer of the Treasuries of the Kings".

Much of what is known about Butehamun is derived from graffiti and from letters between Butehamun and his father. Though Polish archaeologist Andrzej Niwiński proposed the existence of three scribes, each named Butehamun, connected to the Theban Necropolis, this view is considered discredited. Butehamun died during the Twenty-first Dynasty of Egypt.

== Home ==
Butehamun's residence was located at Medinet Habu, a site near the foot of the Theban Hills on the west bank of the Nile River. Four columns of the adobe remain, bearing inscriptions and images of the god Amun and the pharaoh Amenhotep I, as well as Amenhotep I's mother, the Great Royal Wife Ahmose-Nefertari.

== Death and burial ==
Butehamun died during the Twenty-first Dynasty of Egypt, which lasted from 1077 BC to 943 BC. The whereabouts of Butehamun's mummy are unknown. A set of coffins belonging to Butehamun—an outer coffin, an inner coffin, and a "false lid"—were probably found in the tomb of Nakhte-Min (TT291), a workman from the Eighteenth Dynasty. Butehamun's outer and inner coffins are housed at the Museo Egizio in Turin, Italy.
