= Book of the Earth =

Ancient Egyptian funerary text

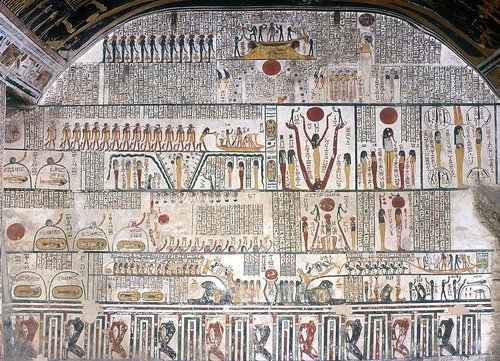
The Book of the Earth in KV9

The Book of the Earth (Arabic: كتاب الارض, romanized: Kitab al-Arid) is an Ancient Egyptian funerary text that has been called many names such as The Creation of the Sun Disk and the Book of Aker. The Book primarily appears on the tombs of Merneptah, Twosret, Ramesses III, Ramesses VI, and Ramesses VII and serves as a counterpart to the Book of Caverns.

The central figures in the story are Osiris, Ra and Ba, while the overarching plot is the journey the sun takes through the earth god, Aker.

== Original sources ==
The scenes were found on all of the walls of the tombs of Ramesses VI and Ramesses VII. There were a few additional scenes found on the walls of other royal tombs extending from the New Kingdom to the Late Period, but since many scene from the Book were scattered around, the ordering of the illustrations is slightly convoluted.

Jean-François Champollion was the first one to publish the scenes and texts from the tomb of Ramesses VI in his Monuments de l'Egypte where he deciphered the hieroglyphs depicted in the tombs. Alexandre Piankoff was the first one to really study the composition of the images and hieroglyphics and looked for a meaning behind the illustrations. Bruno H. Stricker provided an explanation of the Book as a divine embryology in 1963.

== Structure of the book ==
Although it is uncertain, it is believed that the surviving panels of the original composition were each divided into three registers. Thus making it unclear about whether or not scenes from other tombs are actually part of the story of the Book of the Earth or if they are separate.

Scholars believe that the Book consists of two halves with one half containing scenes of punishment. The Book of the Earth uses the sun disc as a recurring theme. The scenes are oriented so that they are facing to the right, and the illustrations can be read from right to left, like in the tomb of Ramesses VI. This is the opposite of the typical configuration according to Alexandre Piankoff.

== Content ==
The Book is divided into five main components; Part E, Part D, Part C, Part B, and Part A. These components make up the theme of the creation of the solar disc and the theme of the sun god, Re's journey in the underworld and making it out into the light. Most of the content takes place within Part D and Part A.

=== Part E ===
In this part, there are six gods shown praying to a sun disc at burial mounds. This is smallest portion of the Book that is known, and Part E is most likely not the beginning of the Book of the Earth.

=== Part D ===
Part D is probably the beginning of the composition, where most of the setting is introduced. A majority of the content of the Book of the Earth is also located within this section. The realm of the dead is depicted with Osiris, as the primary figure, located within a tomb that is guarded by serpents. Beneath Osiris are the gods Anubis and another god who has their arms stretched out to provide protection over his corpse. This scene depicts renewal, while the scenes on both adjacent sides depict punishment. In the scenes of punishment, the gods of punishment are represented and are holding cauldrons.

Next, the mummy of the sun god stands upon a large sun disc that is enclosed by two pairs of arms rising from the depths of Nun. Surrounding this scene is a wreath of twelve stars and twelve small disks that indicate the course of the hours. The hands of two goddesses hold the ends of this illustration.

The final scene in this section shows Aker, who is representing the barque of the sun god, as a double sphinx. The barque is supported by two uraei, and inside the barque are Khepri and Thoth who are praying to the sun god. Underneath the barque are two royal figures with Isis and Nephthys who are holding a winged scarab beetle and a sun disc.

The middle register begins with Horus rising up out of a divine figure called the "Western One." Next, there are seven mounds that each contains a god. In the next scene, the propagation of Horus is repeated in which Horus is now falcon-headed, and rises from the body of Osiris which is being protected by the corpses of Isis and Nephthys.

In the next scene, Nun's arms are holding the solar disc, and other arms and two uraei hold another sun disc. A serpent is located on the top of this sun disc, which might signify the regeneration of the sun.

Like many Ancient Egyptian texts, the bottom register shows the punishment of enemies in the Place of Annihilation since it is below the gods. Since gods are more important figures, they are depicted above others. The sun god is shown above with several sarcophagi and four enemies below.

Finally, we find a corpse lying in a large sarcophagus located in the Place of Annihilation, which Re calls the "corpse of Shetit." This is the realm of the dead where gods and goddesses above the scene hold their hands out in prayer. In the last scene, we find the Apophis serpent being seized by ram headed gods.

=== Part C ===
Part C comprises three registers that might be connected to Part D, but the exact sequence is unclear. The upper and middle registers both start off with images of the sun god in his ram-headed form. Two ba-birds are praying to him while an unknown god is greeting him in the middle register. Behind the unknown god are two additional gods, one being ram-headed and the other being serpent-headed. These gods have their hands stretched out in front of them, towards the sun disc, in a protective gesture. Out of this gesture, the falcon shaped head of "Horus of the netherworld" is projected.

=== Part B ===
The registers of this section are less obvious, and many parts might be considered to belong to Part A. The first scenes in this section consist of four oval shapes with mummies inside, which are able to breathe from the rays of the sun god. There are also four burial mounds that have been turned over and are being protected by serpents. The main part of this section depicts a mummy, who is standing, called "corpse of the god," which is also the sun disc itself. In front of him, a serpent rises out of a pair of arms and holds a god and goddess in the act of praise. Behind the mummy is another pair of arms, called the "arms of darkness," that is being supported by the crocodile, Penwenti.

Next, there are four more ovals containing mummies with four ba-birds, one ba-bird for each mummy. This, along with two additional hieroglyphs, represents shadows. Underneath this illustration are depictions of barques that contain the mummies of Osiris and the falcon-headed Horus.

At the end of this segment of the Book of the Earth, the upper portion shows a depiction of a large burial mound, containing the sun disc with an unknown god praying to it. Two heads and two goddesses that are located on both sides of the large burial mound also give praise. Directly below this, on the bottom register, are four gods and ba-birds that are also praying.

=== Part A ===
In the beginning of this section, the sun god is enclosed by mummies at a burial mound called the Mound of Darkness. Above this mound, a solar barque is shown. Following this scene, Aker is depicted as a double sphinx. the solar barque is located between the entrance and the exit of the realm of the dead, with its stern side facing the exit. Below shows the resurrection of the corpse of the sun, which is a scene that typically occurs in royal sarcophagus chambers. A falcon head emerges from a sun disc, and the light is shown falling on the "mysterious corpse" which is lying down. In the next scene, twelve goddess, each representing an hour of the night, are depicted. Each goddess has the hieroglyph of a star and a hieroglyph of a shadow with a beaming disk above her. At the beginning of the fourth scene, a few of the mummies are enclosed within four large circles. In the fifth scene, a central god, who is thought to be Osiris, is surrounded by the corpses of Shu, Tefnut, Khepri and Nun. The sixth scene, shows a pair of arms rising from the depths. A goddess called Annihilator stands up with her arms reaching to embrace a sun disc. The arms are supporting two praying goddesses named West and East in a reverse orientation. It is believed that the upper register of this part ends with a line containing a title of this work, though it is still unknown.

The middle register begins with the solar barque again. It is towed by fourteen ram-headed gods with all of their bas. Next, a god stands in his cave, surrounded by twelve star goddesses who are extending discs to him.

The following scene, which is scattered around the tomb of Ramesses VI, shows five burial mounds with a head and arms emerging from it. They are raised up in a gesture of praise. In the third scene, the birth of the sun is represented. This scene also occurs on the sarcophagus of Ramesses IV, but there is more detail and more story on that sarcophagus than in this scene.

== Bibliography ==
- Armour, Robert (1986). Gods and Myths of Ancient Egypt. Cairo, Egypt: American University in Cairo. ISBN 978-9774246692.
- Hornung, Erik (1999). The Ancient Egyptian Books of the Afterlife. Ithaca, NY: Cornell UP. ISBN 978-0801485152.
- Hornung, Erik (1996). Conceptions of God in Ancient Egypt: The One and the Many. Ithaca, NY: Cornell UP. ISBN 978-0801483844.
- Piankoff, Alexandre (1953). La Création du Disque Solaire. IFAO (Bibl. d'Ét. 19).
- Piankoff, Alexandre (1954). The Tomb of Ramesses VI. Pantheon.
- Redford, Donald (2002). The Ancient Gods Speak: A Guide to Egyptian Religion. Oxford: Oxford UP. ISBN 978-0195154016.
- Silverman, David (1991). Religion in Ancient Egypt: Gods, Myths, and Personal Practice. Ithaca, NY: Cornell UP. ISBN 978-0801497865.
- Nicholson, Paul (2008). The Princeton Dictionary of Ancient Egypt. Princeton, NJ: Princeton UP. ISBN 978-0691137629.
- Shaw, Ian (2004). The Oxford History of Ancient Egypt. Oxford: Oxford UP. ISBN 978-0192804587.
