= KV9 =

Tomb of Pharaohs Ramesses V and VI

- Burial site of Ramesses V & Ramesses VI
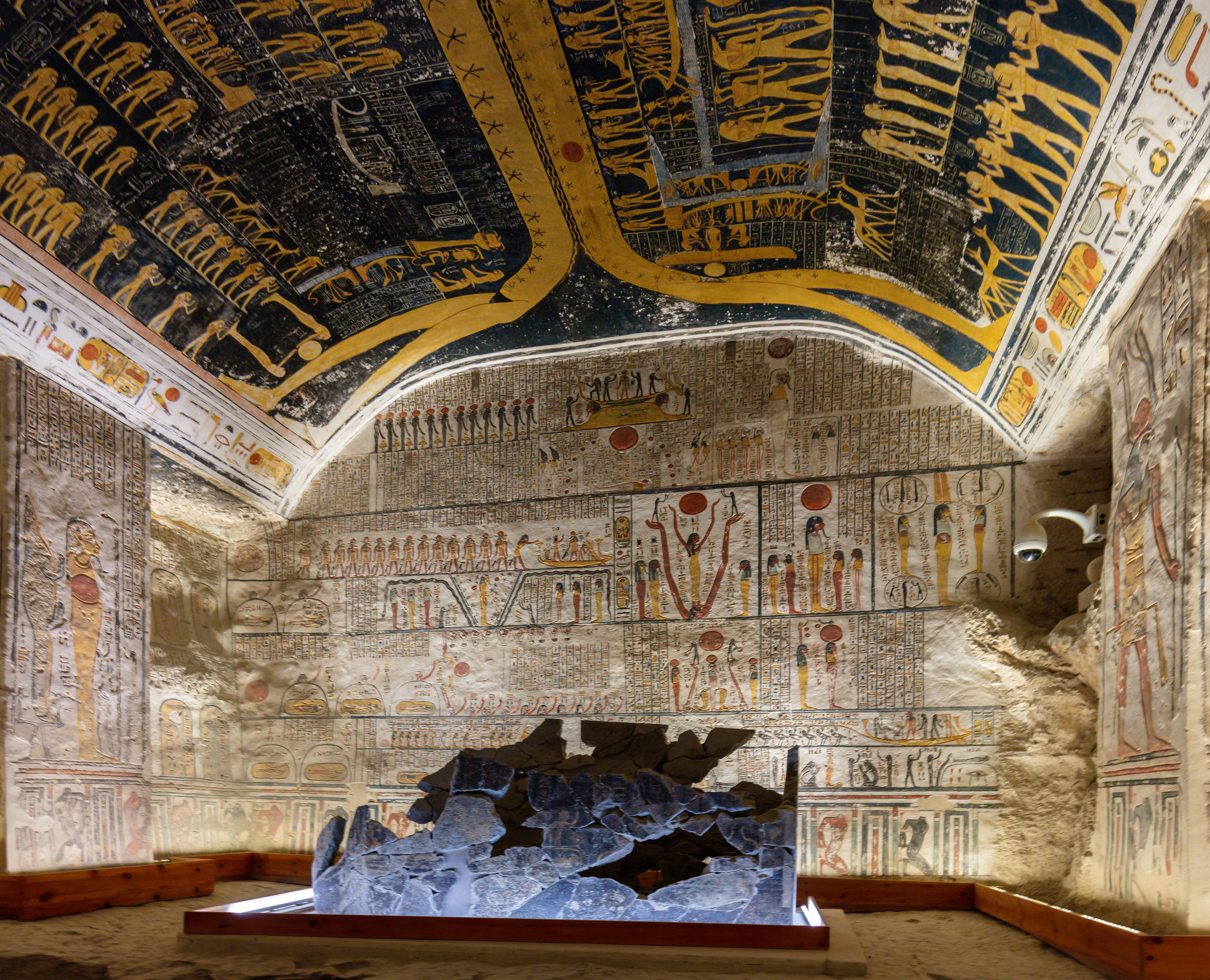

- Location within Egypt
- Coordinates: 25°44′24.6″N 32°36′04.7″E
- Location: East Valley of the Kings
- Discovered: Open in antiquity
- Excavated by: James Burton; Georges Daressy
- Decoration: Book of Gates; Book of Caverns; Book of the Amduat; Book of the Dead; Book of the Earth
- Layout: Straight axis
- ← Previous; KV8 Next → KV10

Tomb KV9 in Egypt's Valley of the Kings was originally constructed by Pharaoh Ramesses V. He was interred here, but his uncle, Ramesses VI, later reused the tomb as his own. The architectural layout is typical of the 20th Dynasty – the Ramesside period – and is much simpler than that of Ramesses III's tomb (KV11). The workmen accidentally broke into KV12 as they dug one of the corridors, and ended up lowering the corridor floor to avoid further collisions with the tomb. The works on KV9 are responsible for the preservation of the tomb of Tutankhamun, the entrance of which was buried beneath huts built for the craftsmen working on Ramesses VI's tomb.

In 2020, the Egyptian Tourism Authority released a full 3D model of the tomb with detailed photography, available online.

== Decoration ==
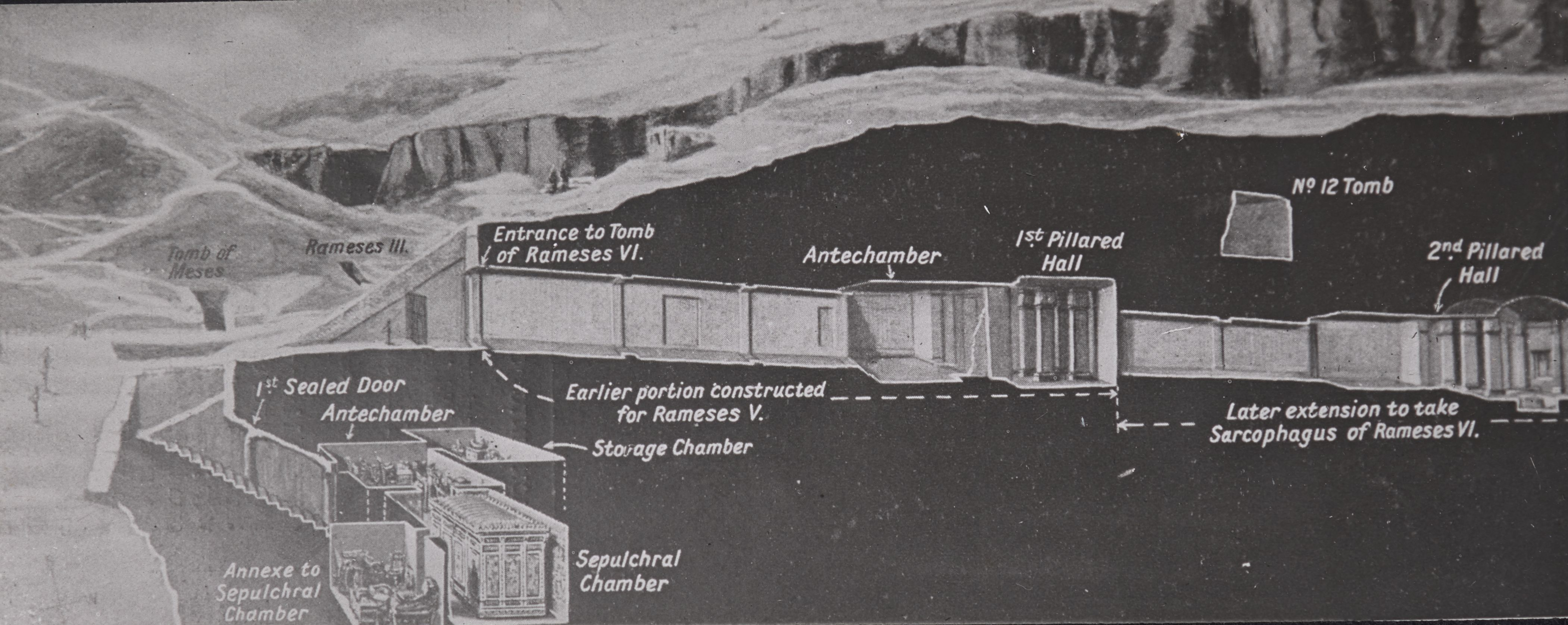
The parts of KV9 built by Ramesses V and Ramesses VI

The tomb has some of the most diverse decoration in the Valley of the Kings. In fact Ramesses VI, in a break with tradition, used the decoration program of the Osireion at Abydos as the template for his tomb. Its layout consists of a long corridor, divided by pilasters into several sections, leading to a pillared hall, from which a second long corridor descends to the burial chamber. The digging of the burial chamber was not fully completed; its back wall has two pillars which are still connected to the wall behind them instead of standing separate.

=== Entrance ===
The entrance is decorated with a disk containing a scarab and an image of the ram-headed Ra between Isis and Nephthys who are kneeling. The jambs and thicknesses, mentions the name of Ramesses VI. The jambs are usurped from Ramesses V.

=== First corridor ===
On both sides are images of Ramesses VI before Ra-Horakhty and Osiris. The scenes originally depicted Ramesses V but were usurped. On the south wall of the corridor begin the scenes from a complete version of the Book of Gates, while the north wall is decorated with an almost complete exemplar of the Book of Caverns. The ceilings are decorated with astronomical figures and constellations in the first few divisions of the corridor, while in the last two divisions, and continuing into the first hall [designated Hall E by Piankoff], is a double presentation of both the Book of the Day and the Book of the Night, framed by an elongated image of the goddess Nut.

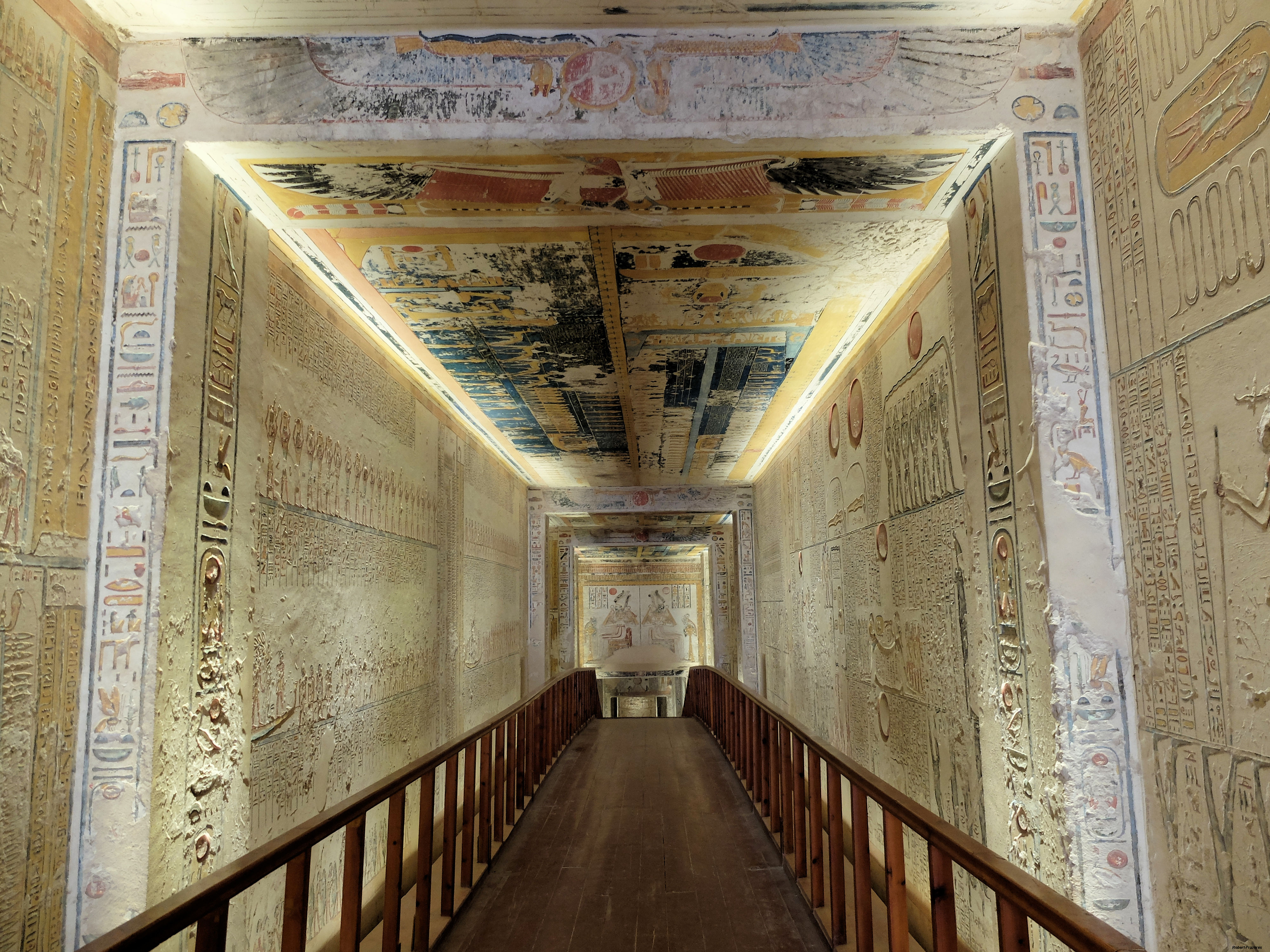
View down the first corridor of the tomb

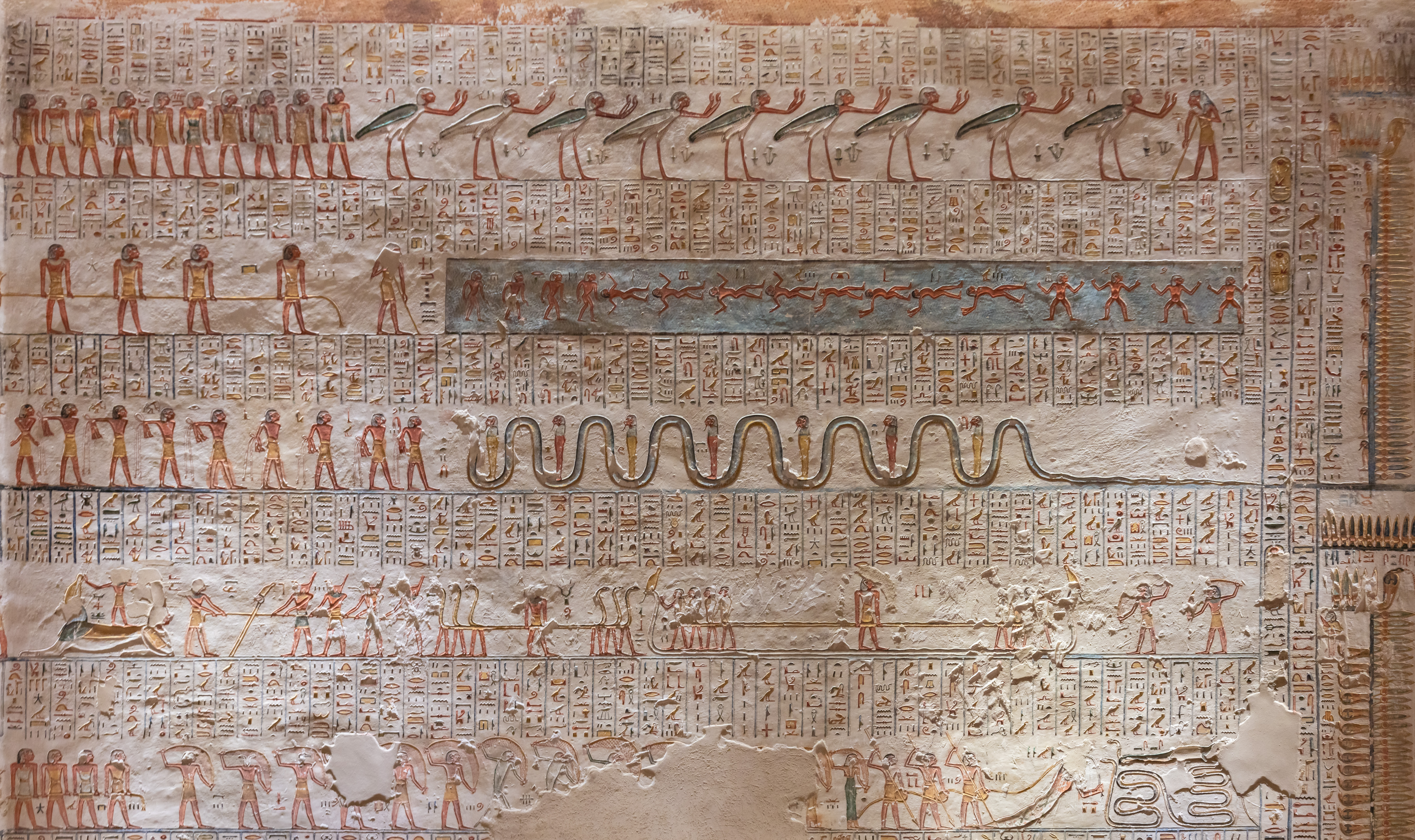
A part of the Book of Gates (ninth division) on the left wall of the corridor

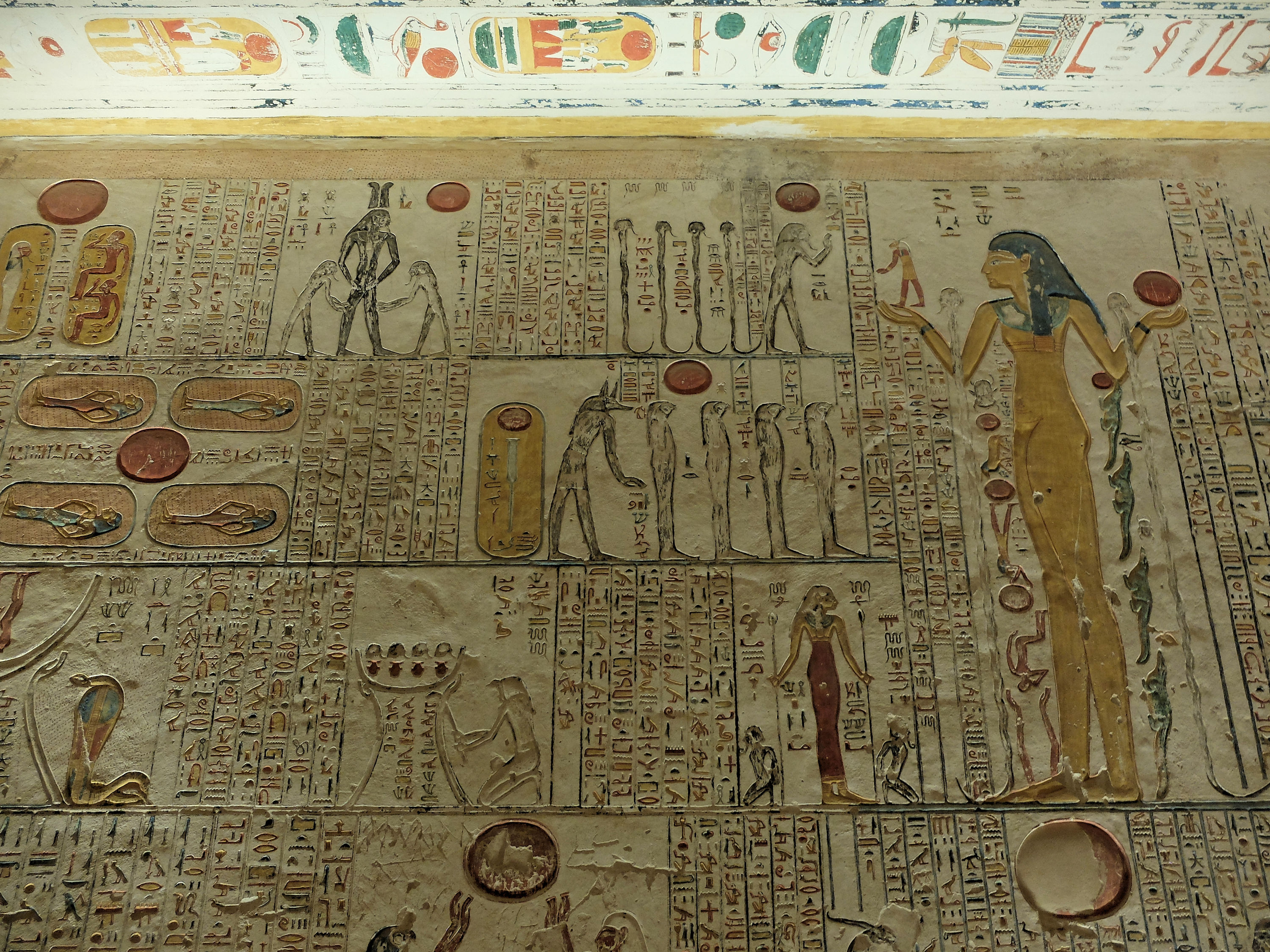
A part of the Book of Caverns (fifth division) on the right wall of the corridor; the goddess Nut is visible on the right

=== Hall ===
The corridor ends in a pillared hall [Hall E]. On the left (south) wall the Book of Gates is continued. The decorations show divisions 10 and 11 including the final scene of the composition, where Nun raises up the bark of Ra from the primordial waters with the goddess Nut above the scene. On the right side of the hall (the north) the Book of Caverns scenes continue. Above the entrance to the next corridor the king is shown censing and libating before Osiris. Ramesses VI is shown in a variety of scenes before gods and goddesses such as Meretseger, Khonsu, Ptah and Ptah-Sokar-Osiris. As previously noted, the ceiling of the hall is decorated with the remainder of the Book of the Day and the Book of the Night, framed by an elongated image of the goddess Nut. The ramp descending to the next corridor is flanked on either side by two images of winged cobras with crowns, representing the goddesses of Upper and Lower Egypt.

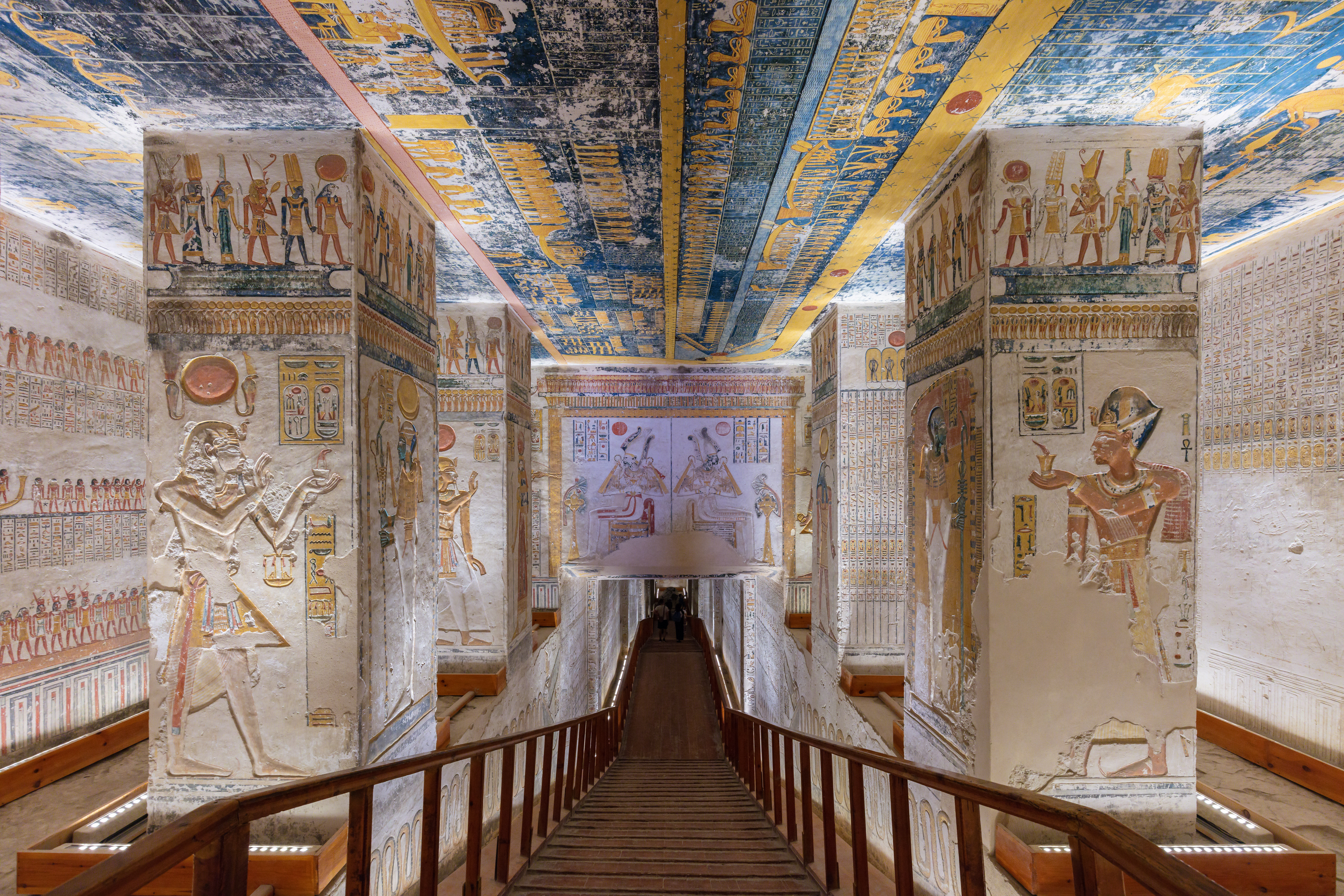
The first hall or pillared hall; a double scene of Osiris is visible in the middle, above the ramp descending to the second corridor

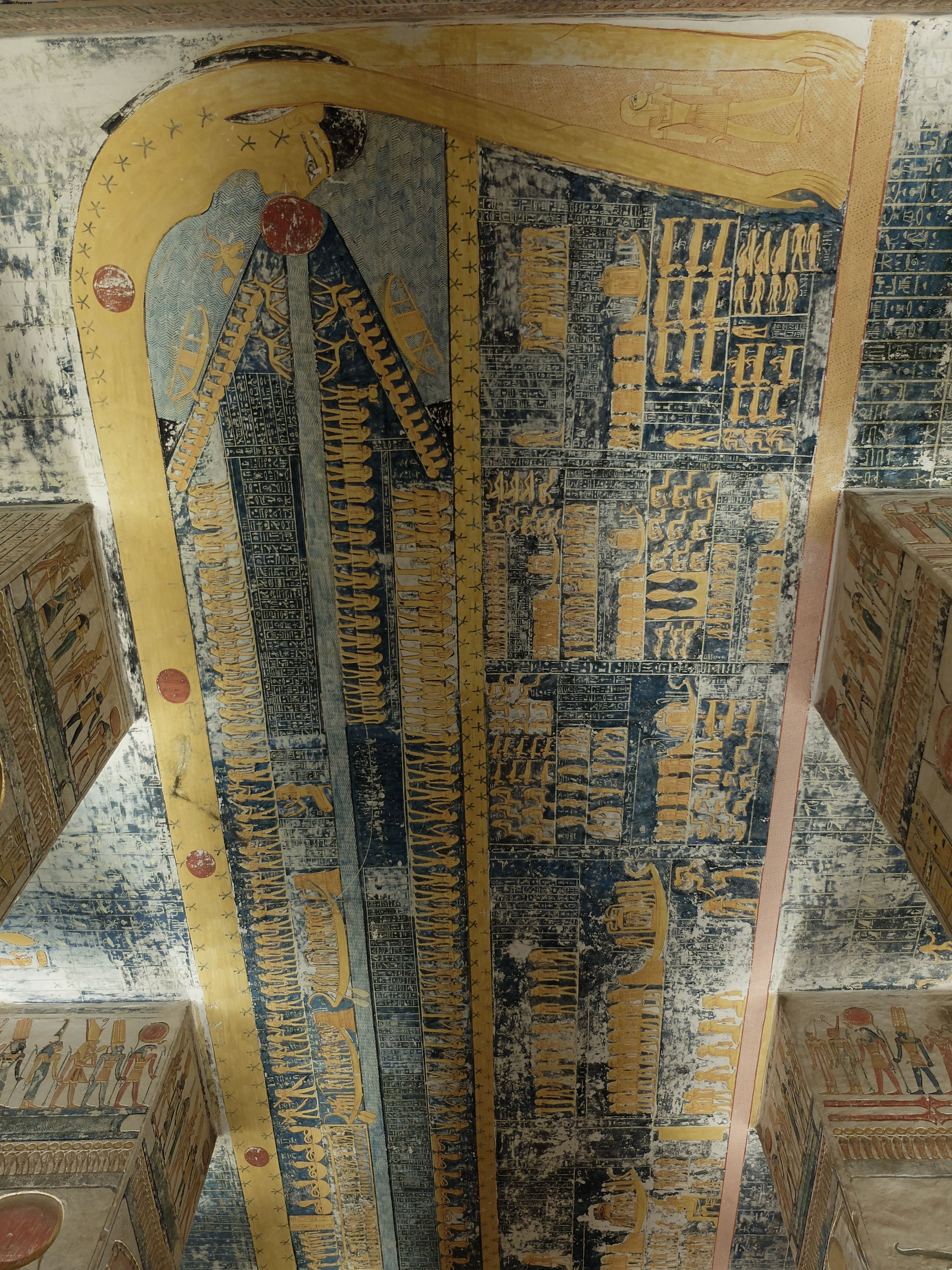
Elongated image of the goddess Nut framing the Books of the Day and the Night, on the ceiling of the pillared hall

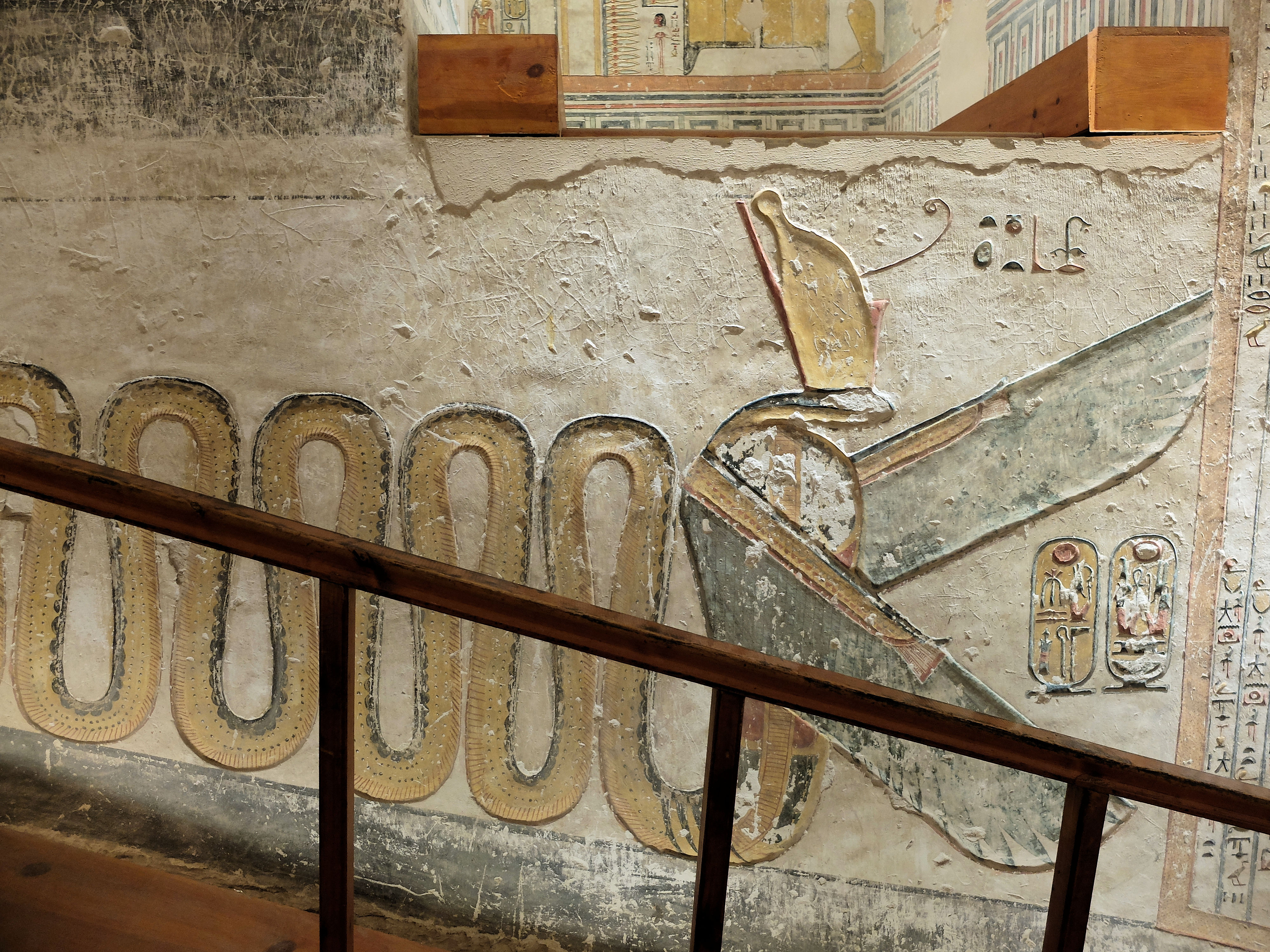
Winged cobra next to the descending ramp

=== Second corridor ===
The decorations show scenes of 11 hours from the Book of the Amduat in sequential order, although hours 7-11 are abbreviated . The ceiling depicts the barques of Ra and the Books of the Day and Night.

=== Antechamber and Burial Chamber ===
Ramesses VI is shown before Hekau, and Maat in the antechamber [Hall H, the Hall of Two Truths] at the end of the corridor, preceding the burial chamber. It contains important transfiguration spells (Chapters 124-127 and 129) from the Book of the Dead. The walls of the cavernous burial chamber are decorated with the Books of the Earth (including the Book of Aker). These include images of a solar boat with the double-headed god Aker, images of Osiris and various gods, the destruction of enemies, and representations of the sun's rays resurrecting various figures. A detailed analysis of these complex scenes are in J. Roberson, The Ancient Egyptian Books of the Earth. The vaulted ceiling of the chamber is decorated, once again, with the Book of the Day and the Book of the Night, framed by a double elongated image of Nut.

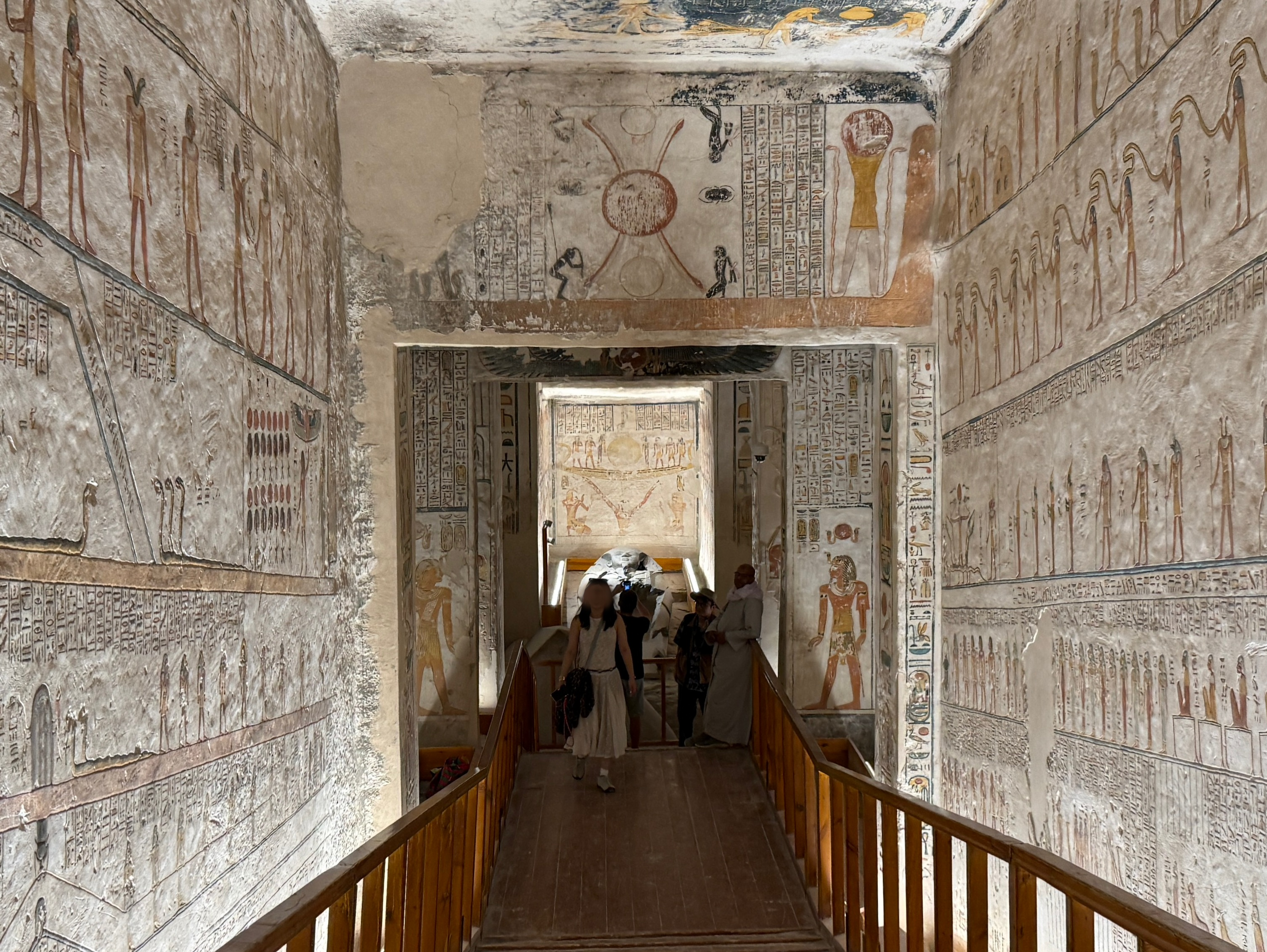
The antechamber, looking towards the burial chamber. The patched area on the Lintel scene depicting destruction of enemies covers the ancient breakthrough into KV12.

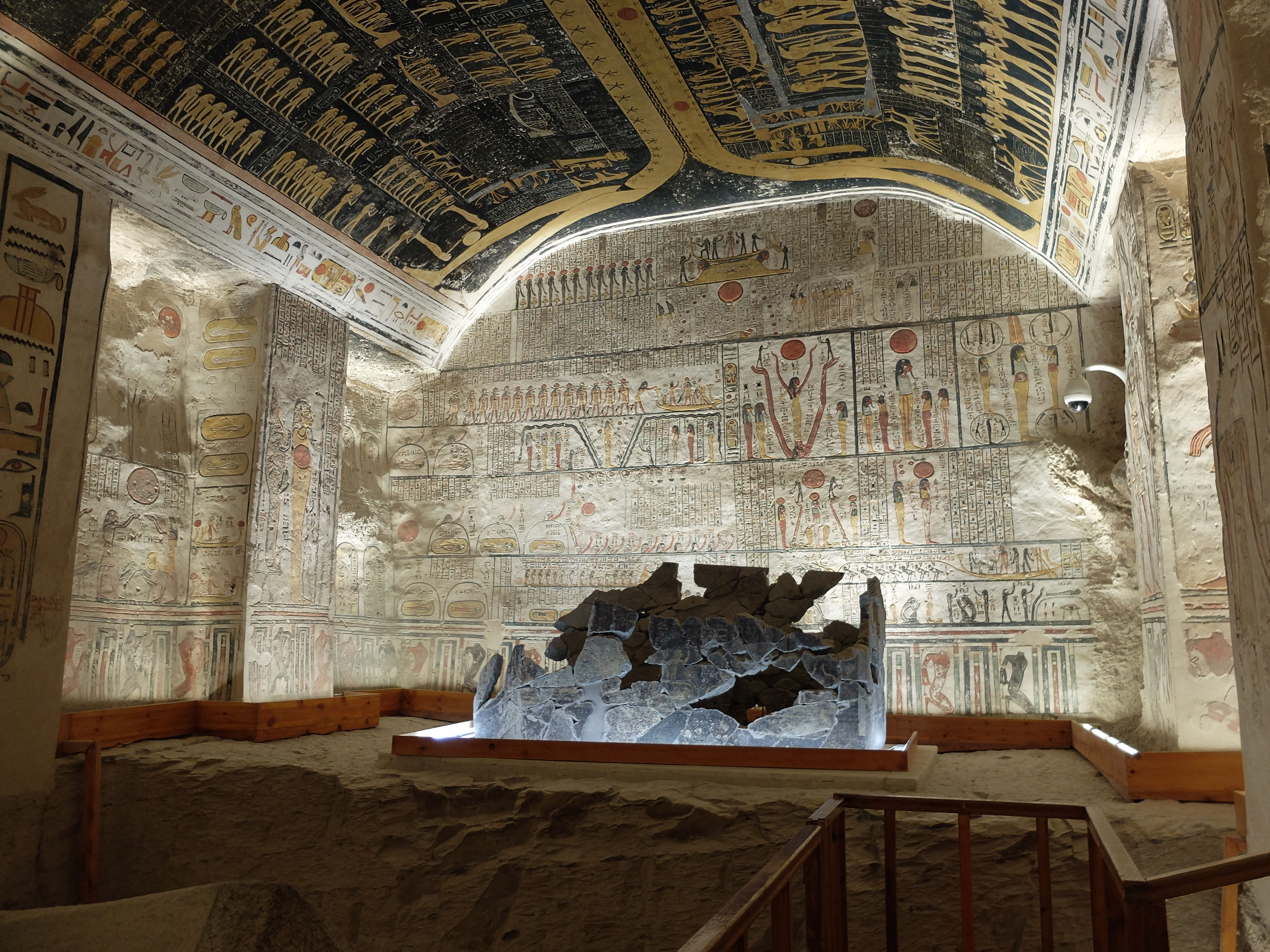
The burial chamber, looking towards the north wall

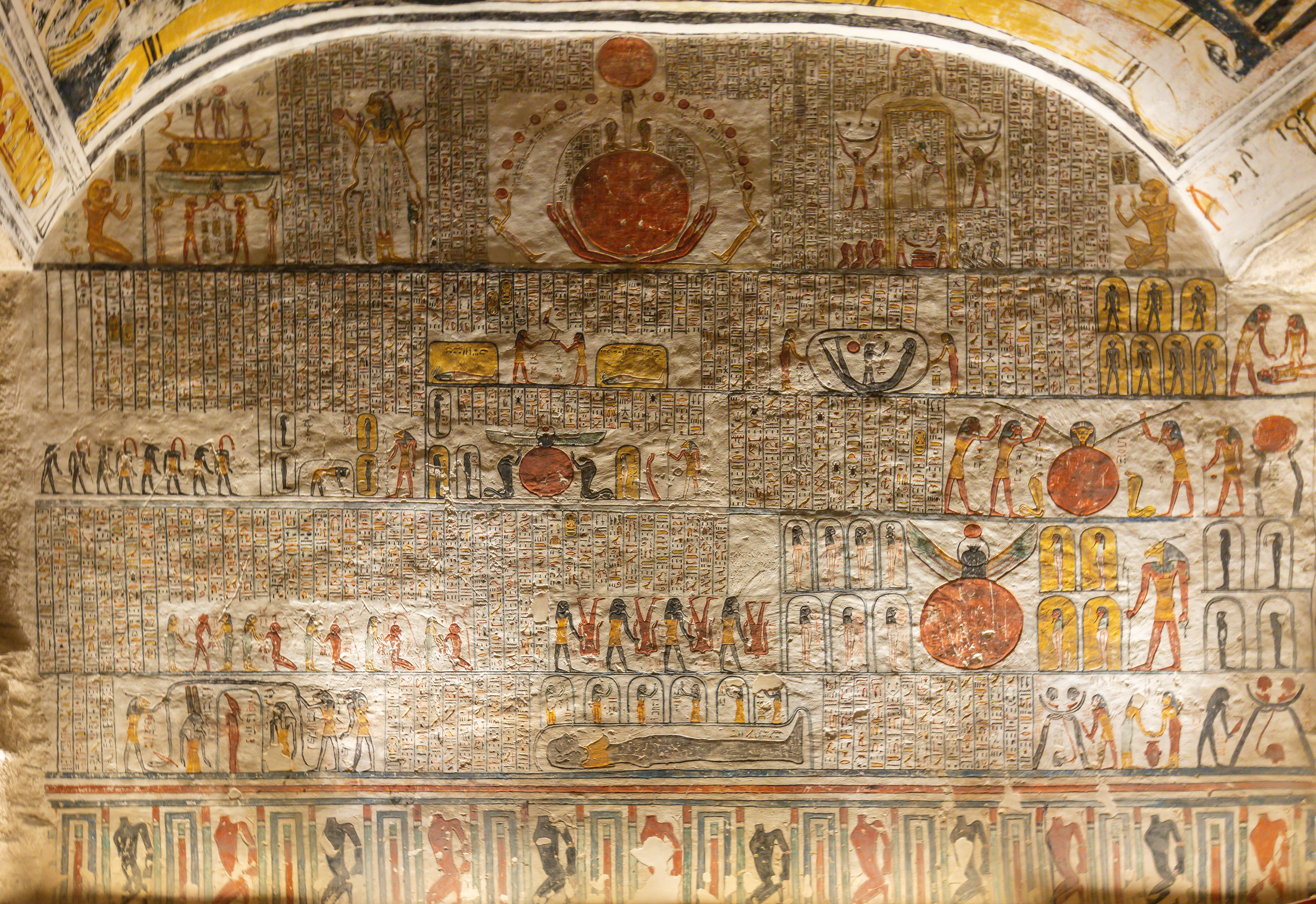
South wall of the burial chamber, with part of the Book of the Earth (Book of Aker)

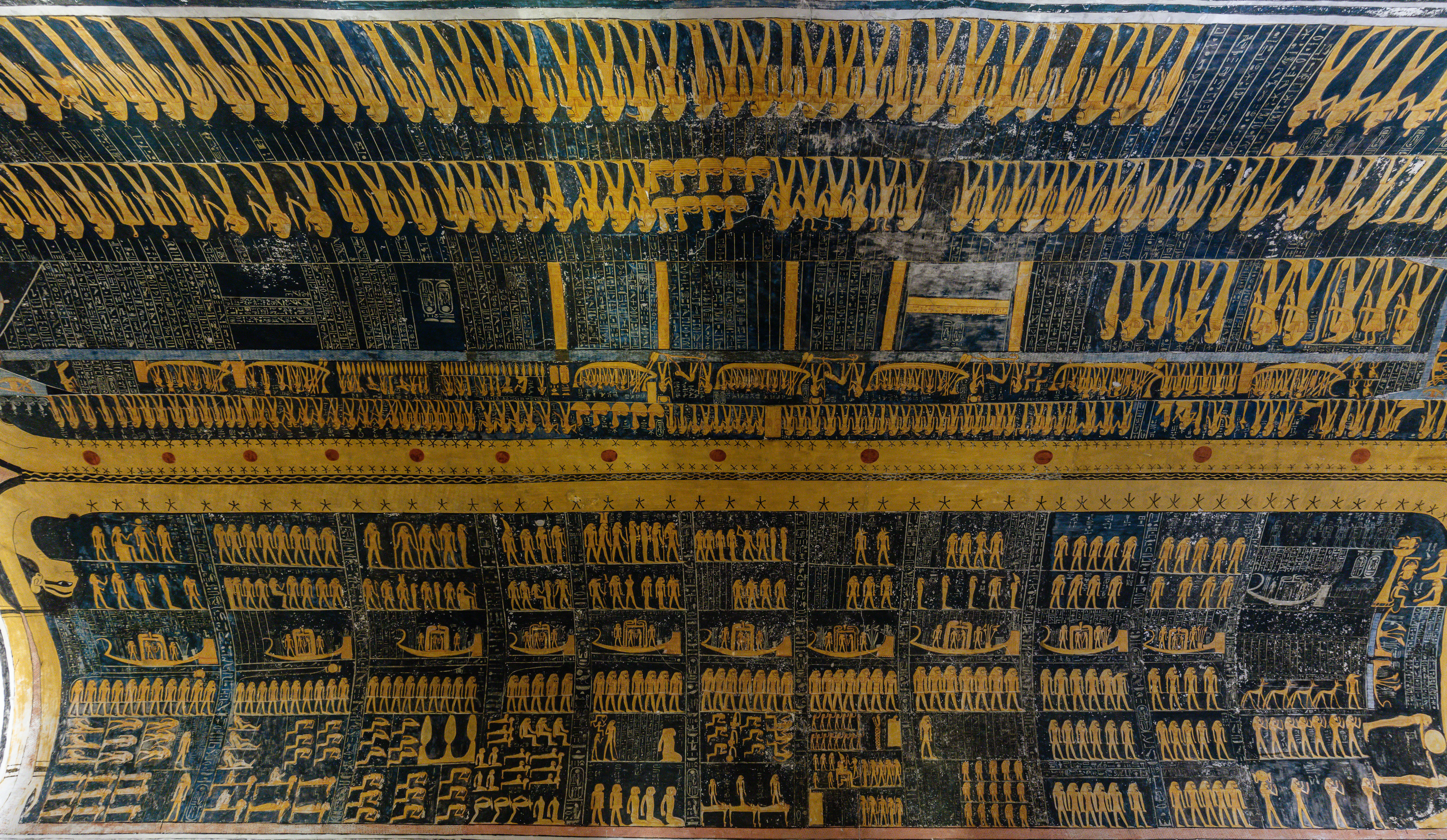
Vaulted ceiling of the burial chamber: double image of the goddess Nut framing the Book of the Night (below) and the Book of the Day (above)

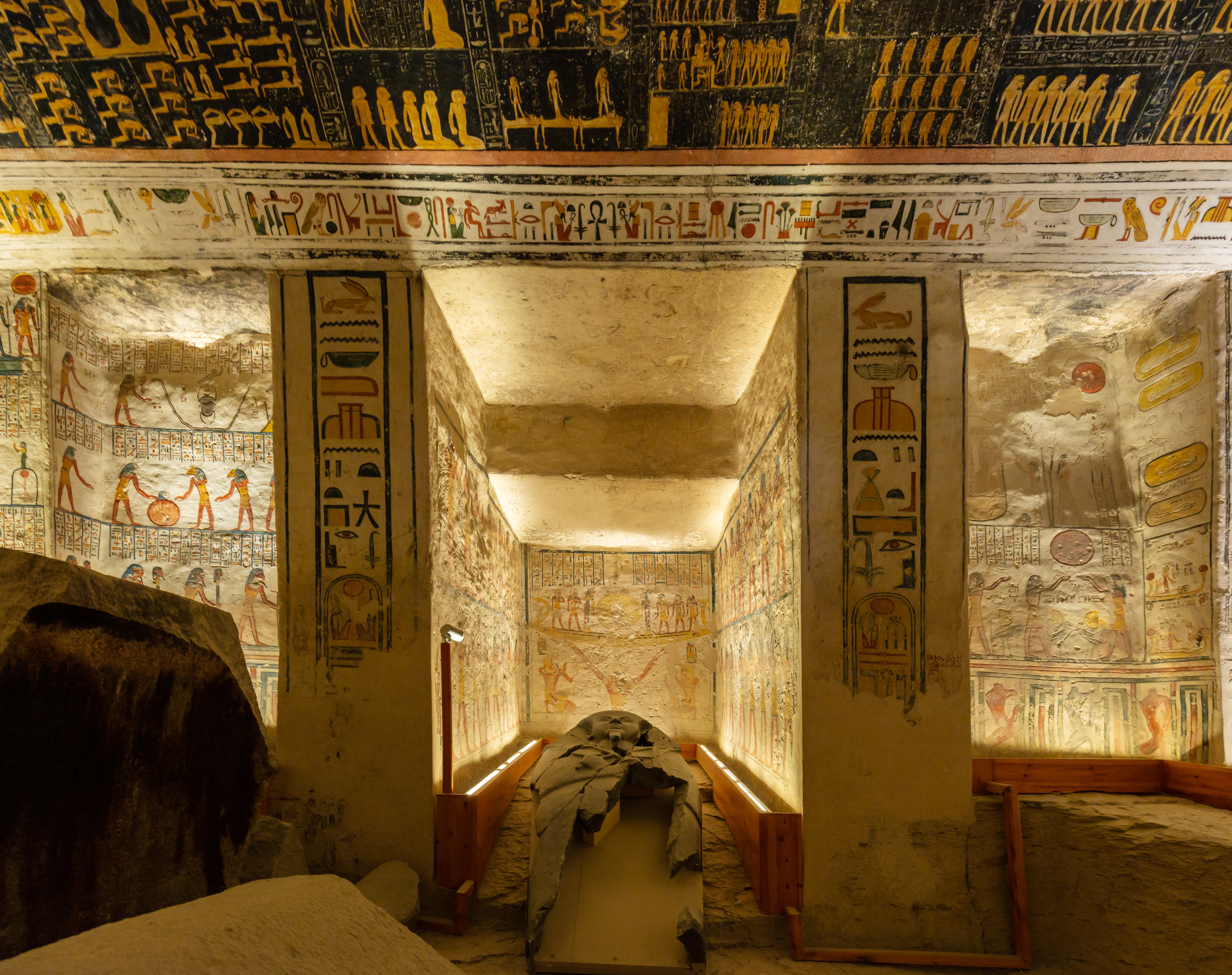
The rear wall of the chamber, with two unfinished pillars flanking a small room in the middle

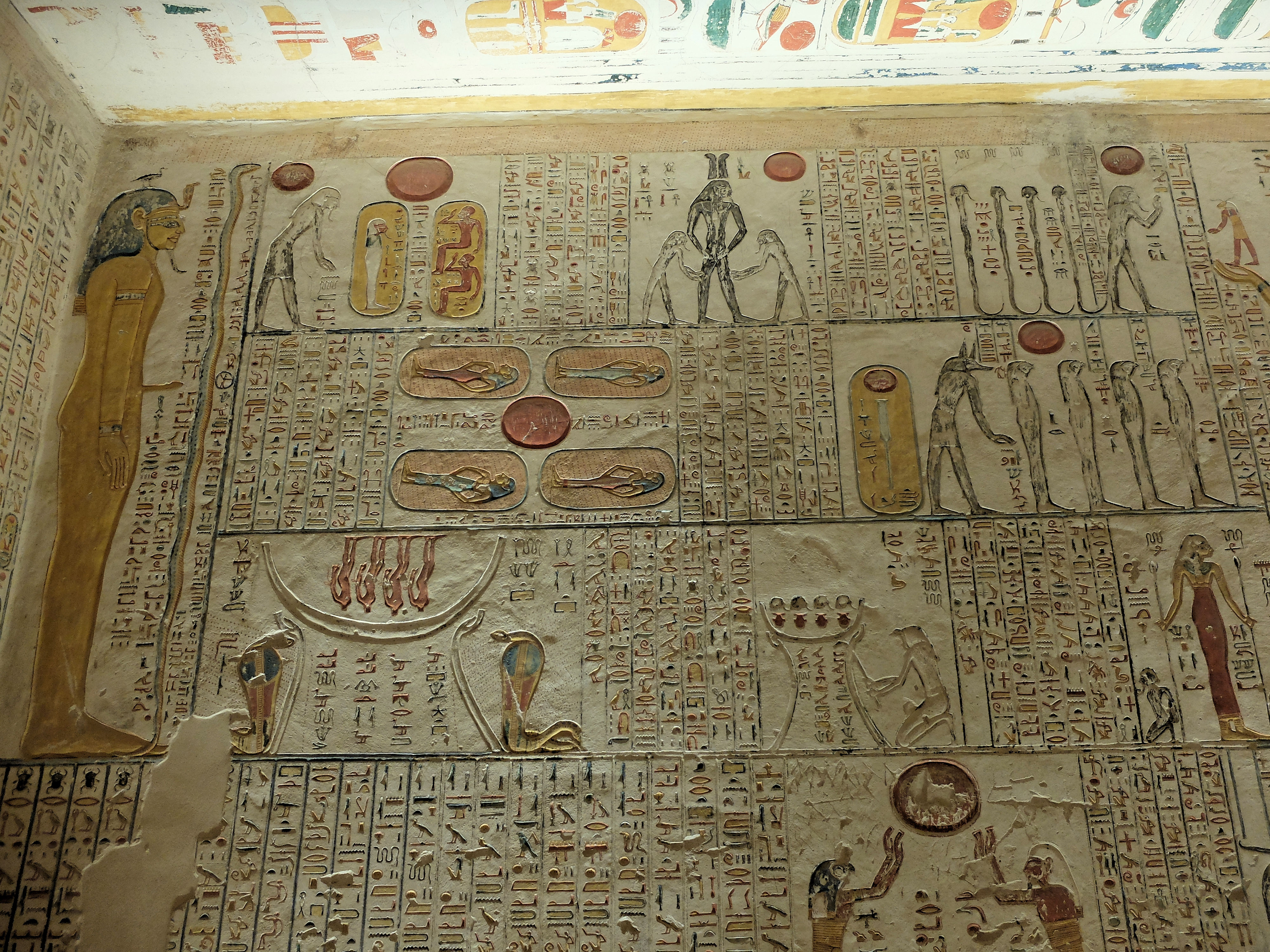
Reliefs on the fourth corridor

== Later history ==
In the Graeco-Roman period, the tomb was identified as that of Memnon, the mythological king of the Ethiopians who fought in the Trojan War. As a result, it was frequently visited; 995 graffiti left by visitors have been found on the temple walls, ranging from the 1st century BC to the 4th century AD. They were left by pilgrims, mostly Greeks, who in the Ptolemaic and Roman periods traveled to the site from different parts of Egypt and the Mediterranean. The inscriptions were written in black or, less frequently, red ink, mainly in Greek but also in Latin, Demotic, and Coptic. They appear in different parts of the tomb, usually on the upper parts of the walls, which corresponds to the higher floor level (the corridors were partly filled in at that time).

The graffiti have been studied since 1996 by the Epigraphical Mission from the Polish Centre of Mediterranean Archaeology University of Warsaw in cooperation with the Egyptian Ministry of Antiquities. Visitors' names form the majority of the graffiti, but there are also longer texts which provide more information about their authors, including their occupation. They tell us that philosophers, doctors, and high-ranking officials were among the pilgrims. Some of the texts are of a religious character (proskynema). One graffito attests that visitors had to explore the dark tunnels and painted images by torchlight, making a pun on the visitor's name, Dadouchios (Ancient Greek: Δᾳδούχιος) and the Ancient Greek: δᾳδοῦχος, romanized: daidoukhos, lit. 'torch':

Δᾳδούχιος σχολαστικὸς ἰατ(ρὸς) ἦλθον κ(αὶ) ἐθαύμασα καὶ ἄεπος ἦλθα δᾳδοῦχος

Translation:

I, Dadouchios, scholastikos (and) physician came and admired in silence bearing a torch

Other graffiti include "I visited and I did not like anything except the sarcophagus!", "I admired!" and "I cannot read the hieroglyphs!". The latest identifiable person to have visited the tomb and left a graffito may have been Amr ibn al-As, the Muslim conqueror of Roman Egypt during the Arab–Byzantine wars, if he is the person named as "Ambros" (Ancient Greek: Ἄμρος) in one of them.

Examples of graffiti from the Greco-Roman period

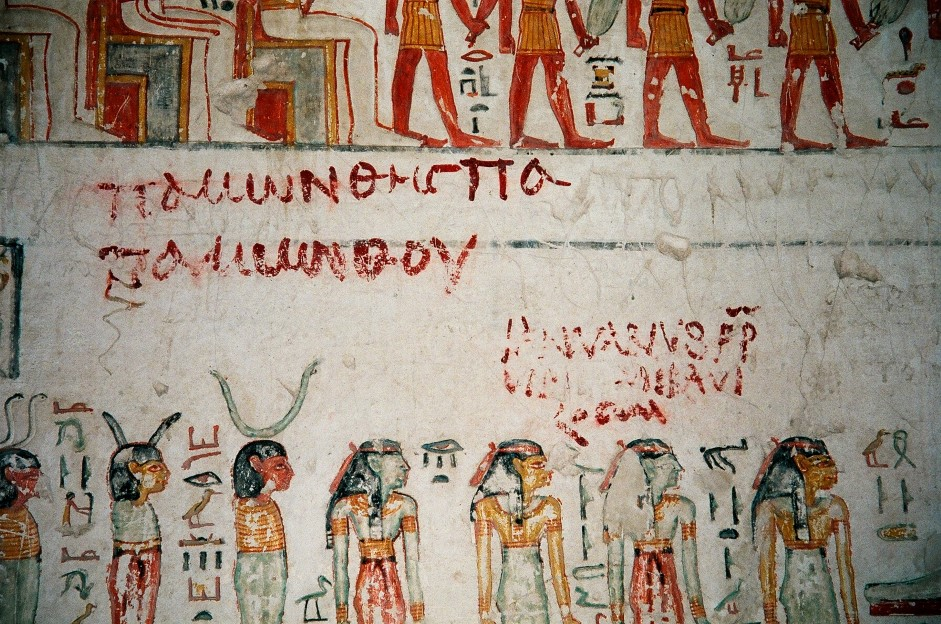

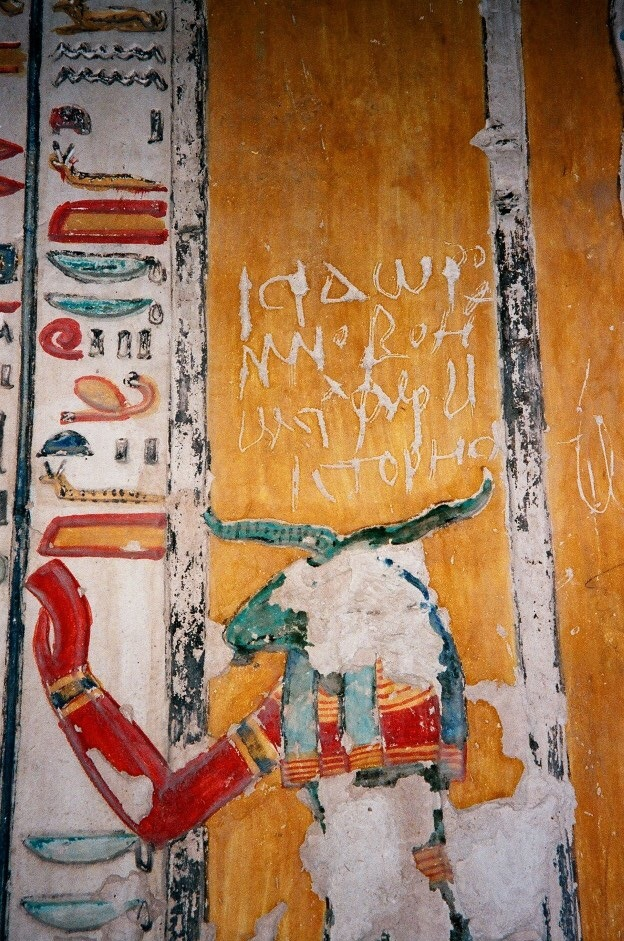

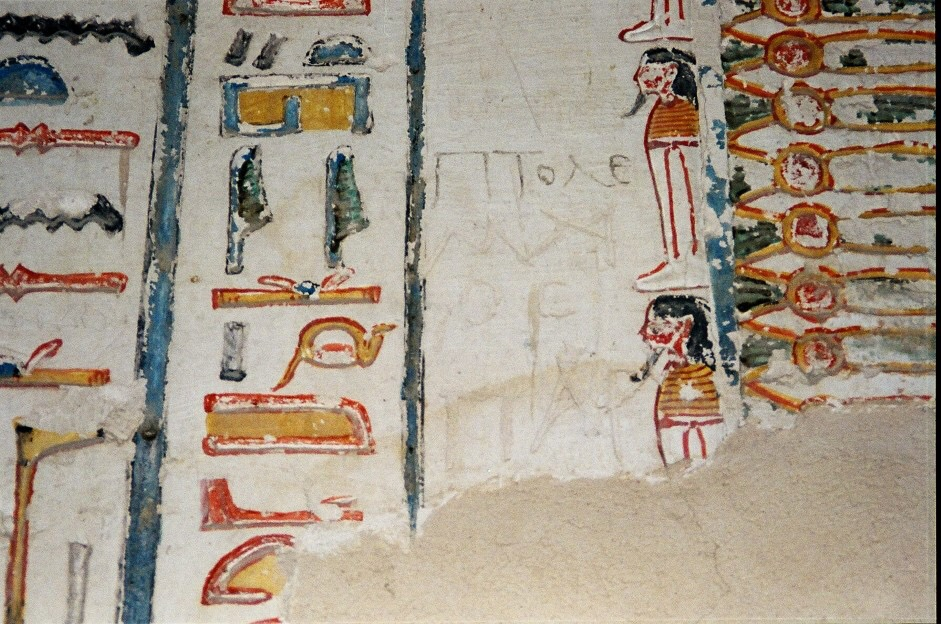

== Literature ==
- Abitz, F. Baugeschichte und Dekoration des Grabes Ramses VI, 1989. https://www.zora.uzh.ch/id/eprint/150956/
- Herzer, C. "The Template for the break with tradition in the Decoration Program of the Tomb of Ramesses VI was the Osireion at Abydos, 2023. https://www.academia.edu/109794059/
- Herzer, C. Study of the Osireion at Abydos, 2023. https://isida-project.ucoz.com
- Piankoff, A. The Tomb of Ramesses VI, 1954, Pantheon Books, New York. https://archive.org/details/tomboframessesvi0001unse/page/n7/mode/2up
- Reeves, N & Wilkinson, R.H. The Complete Valley of the Kings, 1996, Thames and Hudson, London.
- Roberson, J. The Ancient Egyptian Books of the Earth, Wilbour Studies I, 2012, Lockwood Press.
- Siliotti, A. Guide to the Valley of the Kings and to the Theban Necropolises and Temples, 1996, A.A. Gaddis, Cairo.
- Week, K. (ed.), Valley of the Kings, 2001, Friedman.
- Łukaszewicz, A., with appendix by Małkowski, W., Bogacki, M., Kaniszewski, J. Polish Epigraphical Mission in the Tomb of Ramesses VI (Kv 9) in the Valley of the Kings in 2010; Appendix: Three-dimensional spatial information system for the graffiti inside the Tomb of Ramesses VI (KV 9) in the Valley of the Kings, Polish Archaeology in the Mediterranean, 22 (2013)
