= List of Egyptian mummies (officials, nobles, and commoners) =

The following is a list of mummies that have been found in Egypt dating to the pharaonic dynasties. This list includes individuals who were considered to be court officials, nobles, or commoners by historians. Some of these mummies have been found to be remarkably intact, while others have been damaged from tomb robbers and environmental conditions.

== Identified ==
Image	Name	Role	Year of Death	Dynasty	Gender	Year discovered	Short summary
—N/a	Ankh-hap	Unknown	Unknown	Ptolemaic	Male	Unknown	The mummy and coffin of Ankh-hap are housed in the Houston Museum of Natural Science, on permanent loan from the Texas A&M University. His body is much fragmented and has been reinforced with wooden sticks.
	Antjau	Unknown	664-660 BC	26th	Male	Unknown	Displayed in the Royal Ontario Museum.
	Asru	Temple singer	700 BC	25th	Female	1825	The unwrapped body of Asru was donated to Manchester Museum in 1825 along with her two coffins. She was likely from Thebes (modern Luxor). She was 50–60 years old at death; testing has revealed she suffered from several types of internal parasites.
—N/a	Djed-Amunet-ius-ankh	Lady of the estate	Unknown	22nd/23rd	Female	mid-19th century	Djed-Amunet-ius-ankh is estimated to have died at around the age of between 19 and 20. Her death was likely due to complications during childbirth. The mummy is on permanent display at the museum in Racibórz.
	Djedmaatesankh	Temple singer	Unknown	22nd	Female	Unknown	Djedmaatesankh was 30–35 years old when she died, possibly from sepsis caused by a dental abscess. Her mummy is on display in the Royal Ontario Museum.
	Djedptahiufankh	Second Prophet of Amun	c. 935 BC	22nd	Male	19th Century	
	Djehutynakht	Nomarch	Unknown	11th/12th	Male	1915	
—N/a	Hekashepes	Noble	Unknown	6th	Male	2023	In 2023 Hekashepes's intact burial was discovered at Saqqara. His stone sarcophagus was found at the bottom of a shaft at Gisr el-Mudir, near the Step Pyramid. His body appeared to be wearing clothes and jewellery including a collar and belt, and is decorated with gold.
—N/a	Henut Taui	Priestess	Unknown	21st	Female	Unknown	
—N/a	Henut-wedjebu	Priestess	c. 1300 BC	18th	Female	1896	Henut-wedjebu was a chantress of Amun who lived during the Eighteenth Dynasty c. 1300 BC. Her tomb intact tomb was discovered in 1896 at Sheikh Abd el-Qurna, Luxor. Her coffin and mummy were gifted to Washington University in St. Louis and are permanently displayed in the Saint Louis Art Museum. Henut-wedjebu's mummy has never been unwrapped but CT scans revealed her organs were not removed during mummification. She may have died of an infection as she has calcifications in her lymph nodes and scarring in her lungs.
	Hornedjitef	Priest	c. 220 BC	Ptolemaic	Male	Unknown	Hornedjitef was a priest of the temple of Amun at Karnak during the reign of Ptolemy III. His coffins and cartonnage-covered mummy were discovered in Asasif in Thebes, modern Luxor. He was 55–65 years old at the time of his death.
—N/a	Imhotep	Vizier	Unknown	18th	Male	1903–1905	
—N/a	Irtyersenu	Noble	c. 600 BC	26th	Female	Before 1825	Irtyersenu, also known as "Dr Granville's mummy" or "the Granville mummy", was an ancient Egyptian woman who died aged around 50 and was buried in Thebes. She was among the first mummies to be scientifically investigated, with an account of her examination by Augustus Granville published in 1825. He deduced her cause of death to be ovarian cancer (now thought to be a benign tumor). A reexamination published in 2009 suggests she died of tuberculosis, having found extensive evidence of the bacterium in lung tissue and bone samples.
	Isetemkheb D	Priestess	Unknown	21st	Female	Unknown	
—N/a	Iufaa	Priest	Unknown	26th	Male	1996	
	Katebet	Priestess	Unknown	18th/19th	Female	Before 1835	The mummy and coffin of Katebet are housed in the British Museum. She died as an elderly woman and was buried in a man's coffin altered for her use.
	Kha	Overseer of works	Unknown	18th	Male	1906	Kha was a foreman for the workers village of Deir el-Medina in the reigns of Amenhotep II, Thutmose IV and Amenhotep III. He was buried with his wife Merit in TT8, discovered in 1906. His body is now in the Museo Egizio in Turin, Italy. Kha died in his 50s-60s and was in reasonably good health, having arthritis in his lower back and knees. His mummy has never been unwrapped but X-rays and CT scans have revealed his body is equipped with funerary amulets and gold jewellery including earrings and a large necklace which were part of a royal reward for his service.
	Lady Rai	Nursemaid	1530 BC	18th	Female	1881	
	Maatkare Mutemhat	Priestess	Unknown	21st	Female	Unknown	
—N/a	Maiherpri	Fan-bearer on the Right Side of the King	Unknown	18th	Male	1901	
	Masaharta	High Priest of Amun	1045 BC	21st	Male	Unknown	
—N/a	Mehit-em-Wesekht	Temple staff	c. 300 BC	Ptolemaic	Female	Unknown	The mummy and coffin of Mehit-em-Wesekht were donated to the former Colonial Museum (now Te Papa) in 1885. Her parents worked at the temple of Min in Akhmim, Upper Egypt, and it is likely that she was also a member of the temple staff before her early death.
	Meresamun	Priestess	c. 800 BC	23rd	Female	1920	
	Merit	Lady of the house	Unknown	18th	Female	1906	Merit was the wife of Kha, a foreman at Deir el-Medina. She was buried with her husband in TT8, discovered intact in 1906, and is now in the Museo Egizio, Turin. She died between the ages of 25 and 35, and had lost several teeth. She was buried wearing many items of jewellery including two pairs of earrings, a large broad collar, and bracelets. She seems to have died unexpectedly as she was buried with a mummy mask and coffin intended for Kha.
—N/a	Minirdis	Unknown	Unknown	Ptolemaic	Male	c. 1875	Minirdis was the son of Inaros, a stolist-priest of Min. He died between the ages of 12 and 14 of an unknown cause approximately 2300 years ago. His coffined body was found at Akhmim in the late 1800s and transported to the Chicago Field Museum in the 1920s. The coffin was opened in 2014 and revealed that his body had slid around inside it, detaching his feet and damaging his legs and cartonnage mask. Restoration work was carried out with the aim of placing him on display in a touring exhibition.
—N/a	Nebiri	Chief of stables	Unknown	18th	Male	1904	Nebiri was an official during the reign of Thutmose III. He was buried in QV30 which was excavated by Ernesto Schiaparelli in 1904. The robbed tomb preserved only Nebiri's mummified head and a single canopic jar containing his lungs. Studies have revealed he died between 45 and 60 years old of heart failure.
—N/a	Nefrina	Commoner	c. 275 BC	Ptolemaic	Female	1930	Nefrina was from the town of Akhmim. Her cause of death may have been complications of a broken hip. Her father, Irethourrou, and mother, Irty-rou, were both involved in the cult of the god Min. Her mummy has been on display in the Reading Public Museum in Reading, Pennsylvania since 1930.
—N/a	Nehmes Bastet	Temple singer	Unknown	22nd	Female	2012	Nehmes Bastet was a "chantress of Amun" during the Twenty-second Dynasty. She was buried in tomb KV64 in the Valley of the Kings, which was discovered in 2012 by the University of Basel.
	Neskhons	Noble	Unknown	21st	Female	1881	
—N/a	Nesperennub	Priest	800 BC	22nd	Male?	1890s	Nesperennub bore the titles of 'Opener of the Two Gates of Heaven at Karnak' and 'Libationer of the Temple of Khonsu at Karnak.' His mummy is enclosed in a painted cartonnage mummy case and a wooden outer coffin that was originally intended for a woman. He died at 30–40 years old.
—N/a	Nesyamun	Priest	c. 1100 BC	20th	Male	1823	
	Nodjmet	Noble	1064 BC	20th/21st	Female	Unknown	
—N/a	Padihershef	Stone mason	Unknown	25th	Male	Before 1823	Padihershef originates from Thebes and died between 20 and 30 years old. One side of his body shows signs that decomposition started before mummification took place. He bore a title conventionally translated as "stone mason" but he was likely a "sepulchral prospector" who looked for areas to cut new tombs in the Theban necropolis. Padihershef was the first complete Egyptian mummy imported into the United States. He was presented by Jacob van Lennep to Massachusetts General Hospital in 1823 and was investigated by John Collins Warren the same year. He was X-rayed in the 1930s and 1970s and CT scanned in 2013. This revealed that his unwrapped head was reattached with the aid of a stick.
	Pinedjem II	High Priest of Amun	969 BC	21st	Male	1881	
—N/a	Qar	Royal physician	c. 2300 BC	6th	Male	2006	
—N/a	Sattjeni	Noble	Unknown	12th	Female	2016	The mummy of "Lady Sattjeni" was found in 2016. She was revealed to be the daughter of a governor, and a woman of high nobility.
	Sha-Amun-en-su	Priestess	Unknown	22nd	Female	1876	This mummy was one of the very few that remained undisturbed in its sarcophagus since first mentioned in 1876. Sha-Amun-en-su lived during the 22nd dynasty, and was a priestess as well as a temple singer. Her mummy was destroyed in 2018 from a large-scale fire in the National Museum of Brazil, where her mummy had been on display.
	Shep-en-Isis	Unknown	620-610 BC	26th	Female	1819	
	Souser-iret-binet	Unknown	850-575 BC	22nd-26th	Female	1880s	Souser-iret-binet likely originates from Gaston Maspero's excavations in the mid-1880s at Akhmim, Upper Egypt. She was known as Ta-sedgemet but the partial name "Souser" appears on inscriptions on her coffin. She was at 27–35 years old at death and unwell. She had non-Hodgkin lymphoma and enlarged sinuses suggesting a flu-like illness, in addition to poor dental health. She was obtained for the Canterbury Museum, Christchurch along with another mummy, Tash-pen-Khonsu, in 1888; in 1957 she was transferred to the Auckland War Memorial Museum in Auckland where her mummy is on display.
—N/a	Tabasety	Priestess	1301-1035 BC	20th/21st	Female	Before 1940	Tabasety was a Theban priestess who bore the titles "chantress of Amun" and "lady of the house". Based on the style of her coffin set, she lived during the Twentieth or Twenty-first Dynasties. She fractured her pelvis as a child. The injury never fully healed, which would have caused chronic, disabling pain. She died aged 40–60 years. Her organs were not removed during mummification and her body is largely skeletonised. In the 1940s, her body and coffin were purchased by Ivan Lystager and donated to Aarhus University in Aarhus, Denmark in 1950.
	Takabuti	Lady of the house	Unknown	25th	Female	Before 1835	The mummy and coffin of Takabuti have been housed in the Ulster Museum in Belfast, Northern Ireland since at least 1835, when she was unwrapped. She died in her late 20s, likely from a stab wound.
—N/a	Ta-Kr-Hb	Priestess	760-525 BC	25-26th	Female	Before 1896	
—N/a	Tasheriankh	Priestess	300-200 BC	Ptolemaic	Female	1870s	Tasheriankh lived in Akhmin during the early Ptolemaic era. Her parents were associated with the cult of the god Min. Her father, Irethoriru, was a stolist-priest, while her mother, Muthotep, was a temple singer. No title is given on her coffin, but she was probably part of the temple staff like her parents. In the 1870s, she was purchased by Sir George Elliot, who donated her to the Newport Museum in 1888. She is also known as "The Salford Mummy", as she was later given to the Salford Museum and Art Gallery, before being transferred to the Manchester Museum in 1979. X-rays taken in the 1980s revealed she died in her 20s.
	Tash pen Khonsu	Priestess	c.185 BC	Ptolemaic	Female	Unknown	Tash pen Khonsu's mummy was purchased in 1887 from Frederick George Hilton Price for the Canterbury Museum, Christchurch. She came from Akhmim, Upper Egypt and was involved in the cult of Amun. She died aged about 25. She appears to have been placed in a recycled coffin, as textile from the coffin lining was dated to 485 BC – a discrepancy of 300 years.
—N/a	Tayesmutengebtiu	Chantress of Amun	c. 900 BC	22nd	Female	1850s-1880s	Tayesmutengebtiu, also known as Tamut, was a priestess of Amun. Based on the wear on her teeth she was at least 30 years old at the time of her death and has an estimated height of 157 centimetres (5.15 ft). CT-scanning has revealed her mummy has artificial eyes of stone or glass and is equipped with many amulets, including a heart scarab, two embalming plates, wax figures of the four sons of Horus, and sheet metal amulets placed over the throat, chest, pelvis, wrists, and feet; her finger and toes are covered with metal stalls. She was probably buried at Thebes and was discovered between the 1850s and the 1880s in excavations by either Raymond Sabatier, Auguste Mariette, or V. G. Maunier and was purchased by the British Museum in 1890.
	Tayuheret	Singer of Amun	Unknown	21st	Female	1881	
—N/a	Tchaenhotep	Unknown	1069-664 BC	Third Intermediate Period	Female	1903	
	Thuya	Noble	Unknown	18th	Female	1905	
—N/a	Tjayasetimu	Temple singer	400 BC	28th	Female	Before 1887	Tjayasetimu was a "singer of the interior" likely of the god Amun; such singers were often daughters of the elite. CT-scanning has revealed she died around the age of seven and has shoulder length hair arranged on the sides and back of her head. Her mummified body was placed in a decorated cartonnage coffin depicting her as an adult woman. Dark liquid was poured over the entire front of the coffin which obscured much of the decoration; cleaning carried out in 1975 allowed the inscription to be read. Her mummy was purchased by E. A. Wallis Budge in 1887 for the British Museum. He assumed she originated from Thebes, the home of the largest temple to Amun, Karnak, but John H. Taylor and Daniel Antoine suggest she may be from El Hiba in northern Egypt.
	Usermontu	Noble	800 BC	22nd	Male	1971	
	Usai	Official	664-525 BC	26th	Male	Unknown	The mummy of Usai is exhibited at the Archaeological Civic Museum (MCA) of Bologna along with Usai's outer box-shaped coffin and inner anthropoid coffin. X-ray analysis revealed the presence of a further faience bead net under the wrapping, as well as an envelope between the legs containing the viscera removed during the mummification.
	Wah	Estate manager	c. 1975 BC	12th	Male	1920	The mummy of Wah was discovered in a 1920 dig organized by the Metropolitan Museum of Art in Manhattan. The mummy was displayed for years before X-ray analysis revealed a number of small objects of value within the wrapping. The outer layer of the body's linen wrappings were dyed red and inscribed with protective words.
	Wendjebauendjed	Noble	Unknown	21st	Male	1946	
	Yuya	Courtier	1374 BC	18th	Male	1905	

== Disputed ==
Image	Assumed name(s)	Alias	Dynasty	Sex	Year discovered	Description
	Senenmut	Unknown Man C	18th	Male	1881	This is another mummy that was found in DB320, and dubbed "Unknown Man C". Despite initial reporting, no conclusive link has been found that links the remains to Senenmut.

== Unknown ==
The following entries are mummies that have no conclusive identity. In the interim they have been given either nicknames or assumed names by historians until further research can be done.

Image	Nickname	Dynasty	Sex	Year discovered	Description
—N/a	1770 (mummy)	Unknown	Female	Unknown	"1770 mummy" was approximately 13 or 14 years old at the time of her death. It is possible that an unsuccessful treatment of dracunculiasis was the cause as she died a few weeks after her surgery.
	Gebelein Man aka "Ginger"	Predynastic	Male	1895–1896	This mummy was one of six bodies found well preserved near Gebelein (modern name Naga el-Gherira) in the Egyptian desert. While they are the first complete predynastic bodies to be discovered, "Gebelein Man" has been documented the most.
—N/a	Kampp 150 mummy	18th	Unknown	2017	The remains of a mummy were discovered in tomb "Kampp 150" sometime in December, 2017. The identification of the mummy remains unknown.
—N/a	Mer-Neith-it-es	Unknown	Female	2018	In March 2018, a mummy was found in a sarcophagus that was first discovered in 1860 and labeled as "empty". Research is ongoing to determine who this mummy was and when she lived. The mummy and coffin are on display at the Chau Chak Wing Museum in Sydney, Australia.
—N/a	Otago Museum mummy	Ptolemaic	Female	1893	The mummy held by Otago Museum is the body of an elderly woman. She was donated to the museum in 1894 by the local businessman Bendix Hallenstein, who purchased her mummy from a German consular agent in Luxor, Egypt.
	Our Lady of the Nile	21st	Female	Unknown	"Our Lady of the Nile" is an unidentified mummy that was toured by a carnival operator in the 1920s after it had been acquired from Egypt at an unknown date. Eventually the mummy was donated to the St Petersburg Museum of History where it remains today.

== See also ==
- List of Theban tombs
- List of museums with Egyptian mummies in their collections
