= Rifeh =

Ancient site in Asyut Governorate, Egypt

Coordinates: 27.100°N 31.175°E

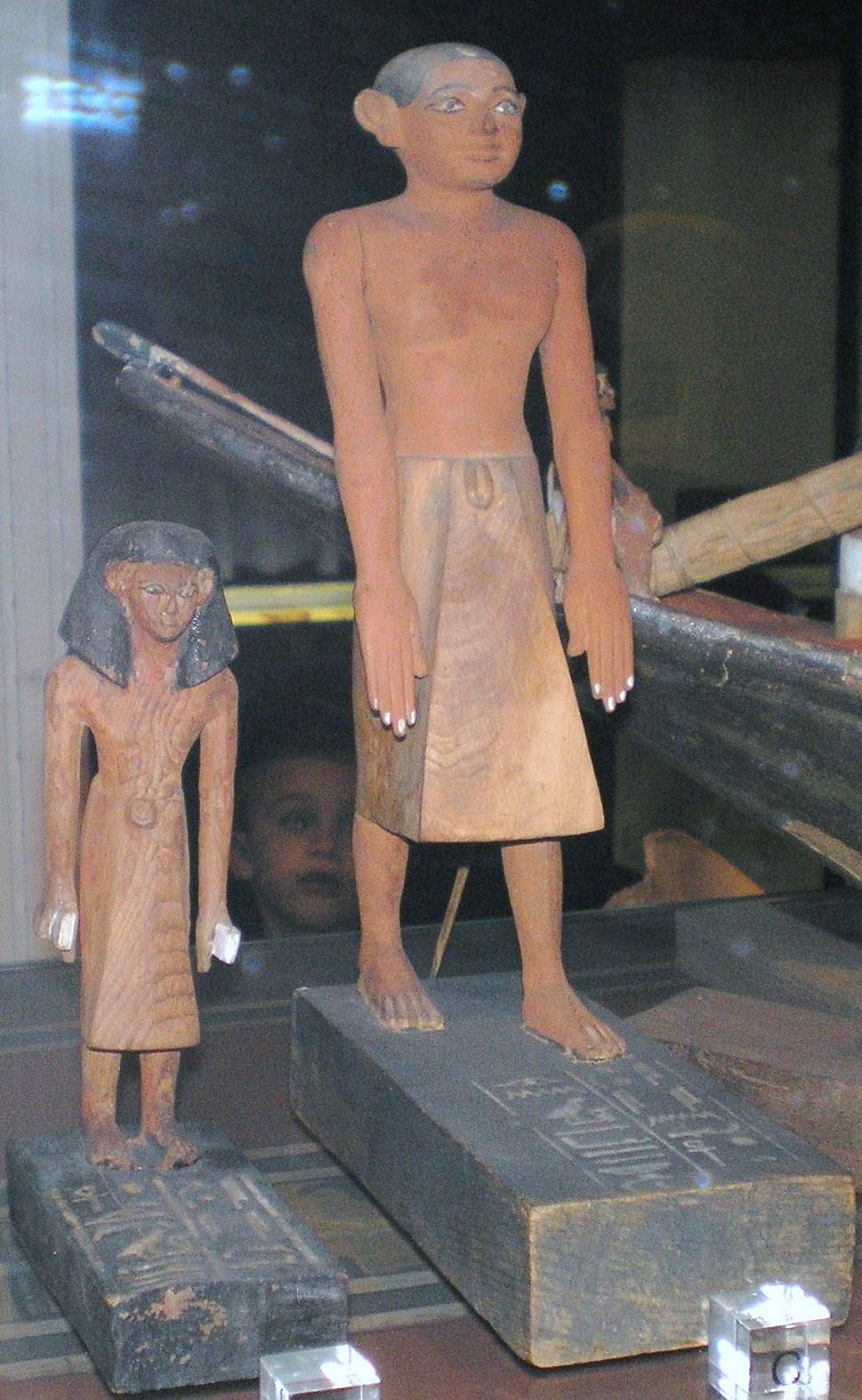
Statuettes found in the Tomb of the Two Brothers

Rifeh or Deir Rifeh (also known as Rifa) is a village in Egypt. The name refers today most often to a series of ancient Egyptian cemeteries nearby. These are the burial grounds of the ancient town Shashotep. The cemeteries date from the end of the First Intermediate Period to the Roman Period. Especially important are the burials of the Middle Kingdom.

In this period Shashotep was the capital of the 11th Upper Egyptian province. Several decorated rock cut tombs were carved into the rocky hills. They belong to the local governors of the period. Nakht-Khnum and Nefer-Khnum are the two whose names survived. In front of these tombs were burials of lower officials that were working for these local governors. One of them is the Tomb of Two Brothers, that was found undisturbed and still contained an array of important artefacts. Further away and closer to the Nile were the burials of the more common people. Typical for many of these burials dating to the Middle Kingdom model clay houses, once placed on top of the burial. They are called in Egyptology "soul houses". Further burials belong to the Second Intermediate Period and to the New Kingdom, when Shashotep was no longer the capital of a province.

The cemeteries were excavated in spring 1907 by Flinders Petrie. The results were published in the same year.
