= Tomb of Two Brothers =

Ancient Egyptian sepulchre

- Burial site of Nakht-Ankh and Khnum-Nakht
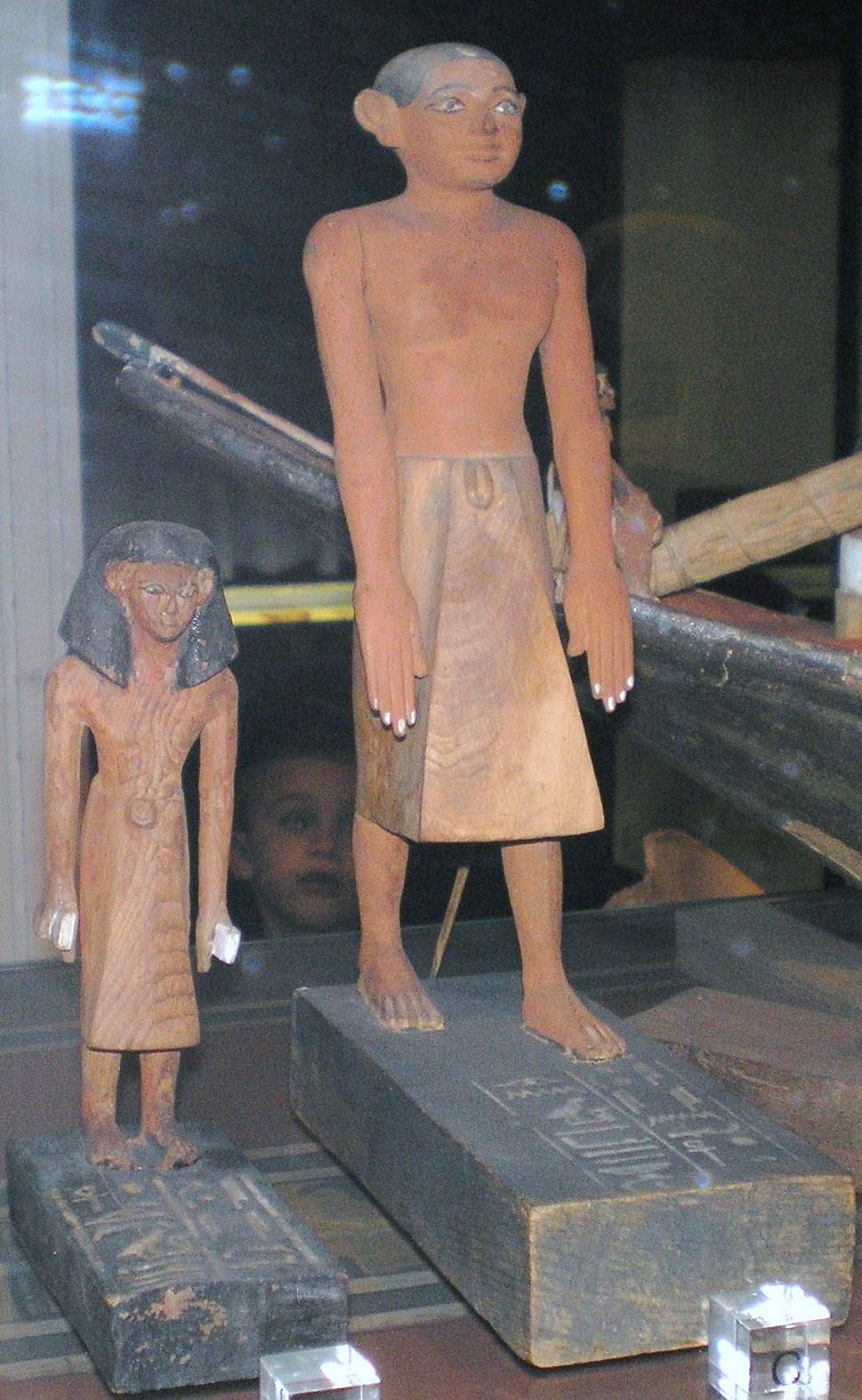
- Statuettes of Nakht-ankh found in his tomb
- Location: Rifeh, Asyut, Egypt
- Discovered: 1907 by Erfai
- Excavated by: Flinders Petrie

The Tomb of Two Brothers is an ancient sepulchre in Deir Rifeh, Egypt. It contains the chamber tomb of the ancient Egyptian high status priests Nakht-Ankh and Khnum-Nakht, which dates from the 12th Dynasty. The whole tomb group is now in the Manchester Museum.

== Tomb ==
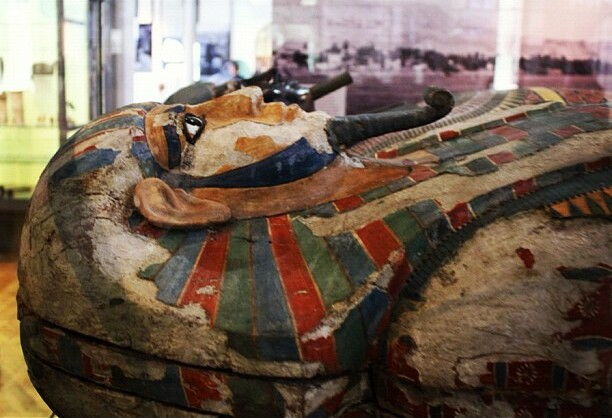
Coffin of Khnum-Nakht

The brothers' tomb was found untouched in 1907 on a dig led by Flinders Petrie at the Deir Rifeh cemetery. The initial find was made by an Egyptian named Erfai. Petrie first described the burial in his excavation report of Rifeh. After the finds went to the Manchester Museum, Margaret Murray published a monograph on this tomb group.

The tomb of Nakht-Ankh and Khnum-Nakht is within the outer courtyard of the larger rock-cut tomb of Khnum-aa of the Twelfth Dynasty. It was reused during the reign of Ramesses III of the Twentieth Dynasty. Surviving decoration executed in ink line drawings in the outer hall depicts Ramesses alongside the unknown new owner and various gods including Osiris, Ra-Horakhty, Ptah, and Thoth. The brothers' tomb is at the eastern end of the court's southern side. It is unknown if the opening was disguised with paving matching the flooring or if it was simply covered with debris. It is entered via a sloping corridor that descends to a depth of 1.5 metres (4.9 ft). At the time of discovery it was filled with stone chips and rubble. The entrance to the burial chamber was closed with a drystone wall of small stones. This chamber measured 80 inches (200 cm) long, 70 inches (180 cm) wide at the rear and 50 inches (130 cm) wide at the front.

The chamber contained a set of two coffins, one outer wooden box coffin and one inner anthropoid coffin for each of the tomb owners. The coffins are decorated on the outside with a palace facade motif and several text lines. The coffins and the texts are very close to coffins found at Asyut and it seems possible that they were produced there.

=== Coffins of Nakht-Ankh ===
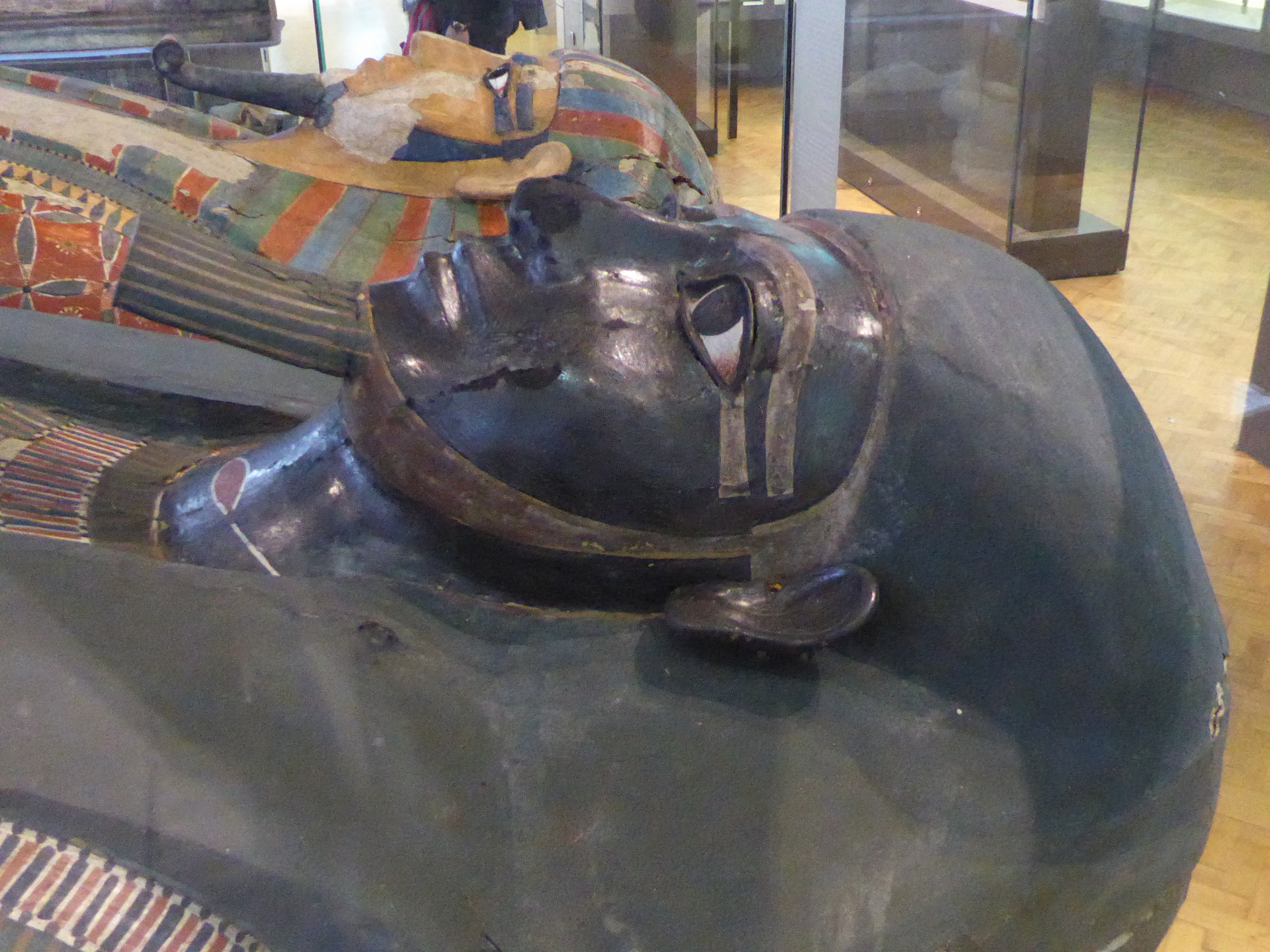
Coffin of Nakht-Ankh

The rectangular outer coffin bears on the lid three text columns. On the long sides there are four double columns on each side. At the top of the long sides there are two horizontal text lines. The short ends have two columns and again two horizontal text lines. On the lid Nakht-Ankh bears the title son of a governor and is called begotten of Khnumaa. The middle text column is an offering formula addressing Anubis with the wish that the deceased may cross with a ferry, that he might be buried and that he might ascend to the great god. The other spell expressed the wish that Nakht-Ankh might sit in the boat of the sun god, that will cross the heaven. Evidently the spell made sure that Nakht-Ankh will be in the circle of deities after death. The third spell on the lid finally expresses the wish that the deceased becomes the son of the sky goddess Nut to be under her protection. The texts on the coffin box have different functions. Some of the spells are part of the modern corpus of Coffin Texts (on the coffin there are the coffin text spells 30, 31, 32, 609 and 345). Interestingly, the coffin is almost identical to the coffin of a certain Djefahapy that was found at Asyut.

=== Further objects in the burial ===
Next to the coffins was found a canopic box with four canopic vessels. There were three statuettes of the tomb owners. Also, some wooden models of servants, models of boats and some pottery vessels.

== The tomb owners ==
Nakht-ankh and Khnum-nakht are only known from this burial. They are not attested for sure from other sources. Nakht-Ankh bears as only title the designation son of a governor. He is also called begotten of Khnumaa. Khnum-Nakht bears the titles son of governor, son of the son of a governor and wab-priest of Khnum, lord of Shashotep. He is also called begotten of Khnumaa. Both their coffins name their mother as Khnum-aa. Their mummies were found heavily decayed.

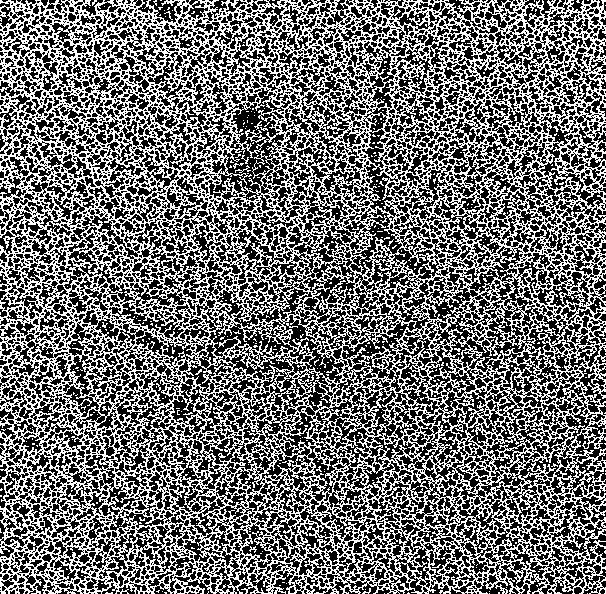
Cross-linked DNA extracted from the 4,000-year-old liver of the ancient Egyptian priest Nekht-Ankh

Ancient DNA analysis of the mummies of Nakht-Ankh and Khnum-Nakht, found that the brothers belonged to the M1a1 mtDNA haplogroup with 88.05–91.27% degree of confidence, thus confirming the African origins of the two individuals. The presence of M1 in Africa is the result of a back-migration from Asia. The analysis of mitochondrial DNA and the Y chromosomes made it possible to establish that the two titular brothers were actually half brothers, having the same mother but different fathers. In 2023, Nakht-Ankh's Y-DNA was published by FTDNA under haplogroup H2.

In terms of morphological characteristics and craniofacial criteria, Nakht-Ankh was more northern Mediterranean, while Khnum-Nakht exhibited strong African traits.

== Manchester Museum ==
The tomb group was transferred to the Manchester Museum in the year of its discovery having first been placed on display at University College London. Khnum-nakht had his wrappings removed on 6 May 1908 in a public unwrapping at the Chemistry Lecture Theatre at Manchester University. Nakht-ankh also had his wrappings removed after arriving at Manchester but its unclear when. In 1912, the tomb group was moved to a newly build extension focused on the museum's Egyptian collection. In 1979, the display of the tomb group was redone as part of the "O! Osiris, Live Forever!" exhibition. The faces of the mummies were also reconstructed that same year.

== Literature ==
- Rosalie David: The Two Brothers, Death and Afterlife in Middle Kingdom Egypt, Rutherford Press, Bolton 2007 ISBN 978-0-9547622-3-0
