= Collection of mummies in the National Museum of Brazil =

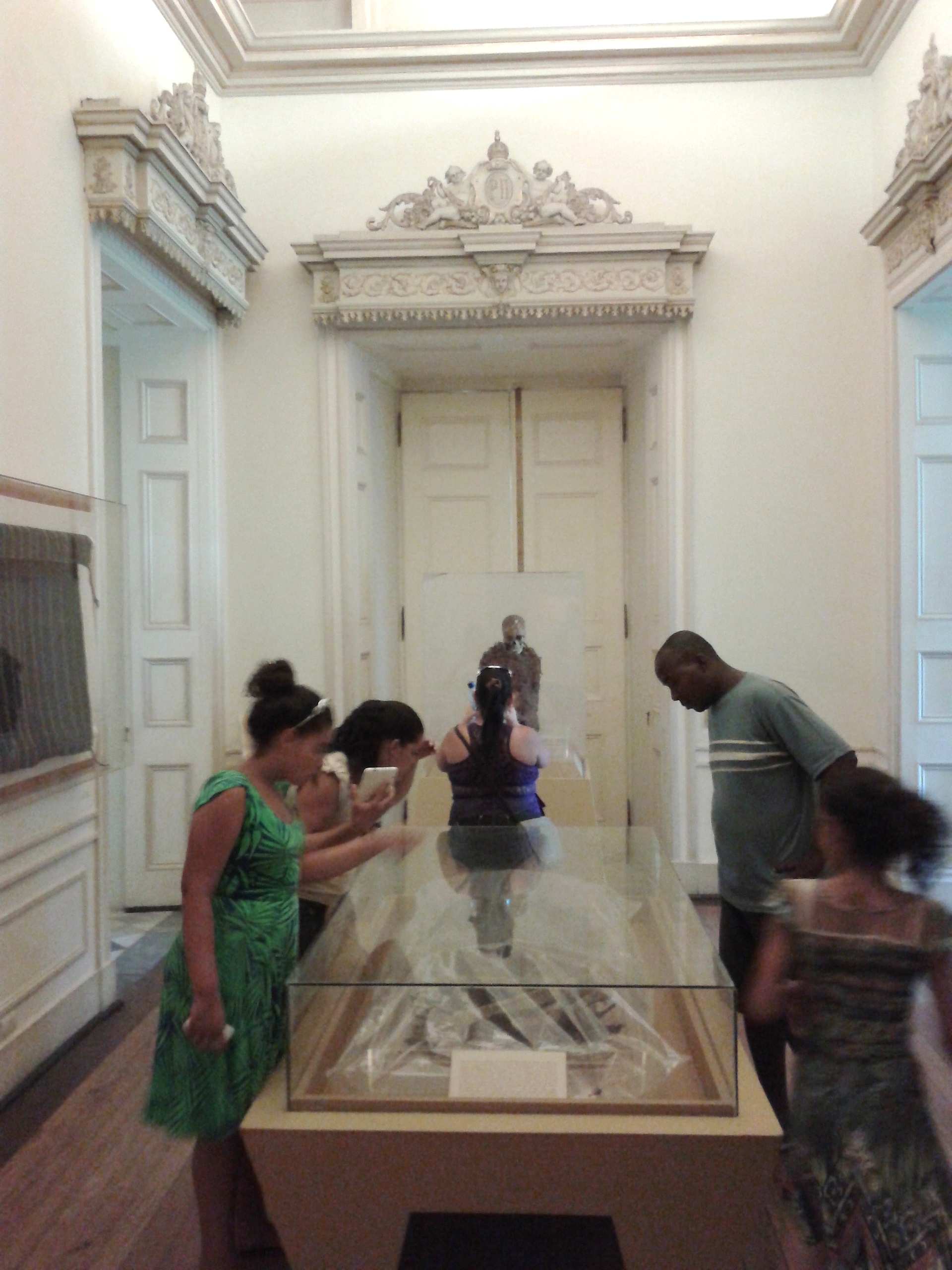
Exhibition of mummies in the museum.

The National Museum of Brazil collections include an exhibition of mummies from South American and Egyptian civilizations.

The current status of the collection is unknown after the fire that destroyed the museum in 2018.

Image	Name	Origin	Date	Notes
	Mummified human male head	Egypt	1550-1070 B.C.	New Kingdom. Male, 25-45 years.
	Mummified head	Egypt	1000 B.C.	Mummified head covered with black resin and wrapped with linen strips.
	Coffin with mummified ibis	Egypt	c. 332 B.C.	Ptolemaic Period.
	Coffin in the shape of a falcon with its mummy	Egypt	c. 665 B.C.	Late Period.
	Coffin in the shape of a cat with its mummy	Egypt	c. 332 B.C.	Ptolemaic Period.
	Mummified skull	Egypt	1000 B.C.	Roman Period.
	Fragment of mummy cartonnage	Egypt	c. 30 B.C. - 641 A.D	Roman Period.
	Mummified cat	Egypt	1st century B.C.	Roman Period.
	Mummified cat	Egypt	c. 30 B.C.	Ptolemaic or Roman Period.
	Mummy of Harsiese	Egypt	c. 1070-664 B.C.	Third Intermediate Period, XXI/XXVI Dynasties.
	Mummy of a child	Egypt	c. 30 B.C. - 395 A.D.	Roman Period.
	Mummy of a woman ("Princess Kherima")	Egypt	1st-3rd centuries A.D.	Roman Period.
	Mummified crocodiles	Egypt	c. 332-30 B.C.	Ptolemaic or Roman Period.
	Mummified right foot	Egypt	1000 B.C.	Roman Period. Right foot and part of leg, wrapped with thirteen strips of linen.
	Mummified left foot	Egypt	1000 B.C.	Roman Period. Left foot wrapped with linen strips covered with brown resin and piece of cartonnage with squared line motif, tied to the sole with strings, probably a sandal.
	Sarcophagus of Sha-amun-en-su	Egypt	c. 750 B.C.	Third Intermediate Period, XXIII Dynasty. Destroyed in the 2018 fire.
	Mummified boy	Chile		
	Atacama mummy	Chile		
	Mummified skull	Shuar		
	Aymara mummy	Aymara people		Male, 30-40 years.
	Mummified woman			
