= Sha-Amun-en-su =

Ancient Egyptian priestess

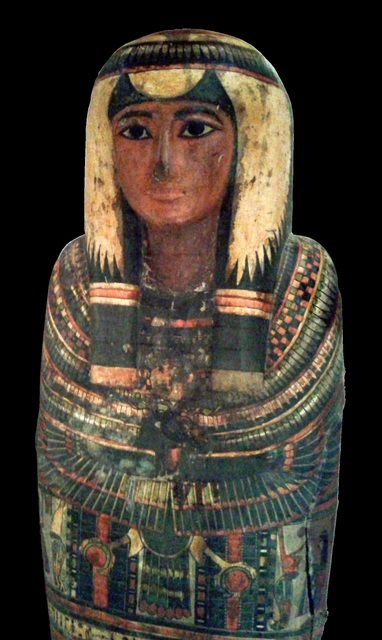
- Detail of the coffin of Sha-Amun-en-su
- Year: c. 750 B.C.
- Medium: Stucco and polychromated wood
- Subject: Sarcophagus and mummy
- Dimensions: 1.58 m (62 in)
- Condition: Destroyed
- Location: National Museum, Rio de Janeiro
- Accession: 1876

Sha-Amun-en-su (Ancient Egyptian: the fertile fields of Amun) was an Egyptian priestess and singer who lived in Thebes during the first half of the 8th century B.C. She was responsible for ceremonial duties at the Temple of Karnak, dedicated to the god Amun. Sha-Amun-en-su was a Heset, i.e., a member of the foremost group of singers with ritualistic functions active in the temple of Amun. After her death, which is estimated to have occurred around the age of 50, the singer was mummified and placed in a sarcophagus made of stucco and polychrome wood. Since its sealing, more than 2,700 years ago, Sha-Amun-en-su's sarcophagus had never been opened, throughout its history, conserving inside the singer's mummy, a feature that gave it extreme rarity.

The sarcophagus and its mummy were given as presents to the Brazilian emperor Dom Pedro II during his second travel to Egypt, in 1876, by the Khedive Ismail Pasha. They became featured items displayed in the Palace of São Cristóvão, integrating Pedro II's private collection until the Proclamation of the Republic, in 1889, when they became part of the Egyptian collection of the National Museum of Rio de Janeiro. However, a large-scale fire in the museum on 2 September 2018, destroyed the sarcophagus and the mummy, as well as almost all archaeological artifacts in permanent display.

== Biography ==
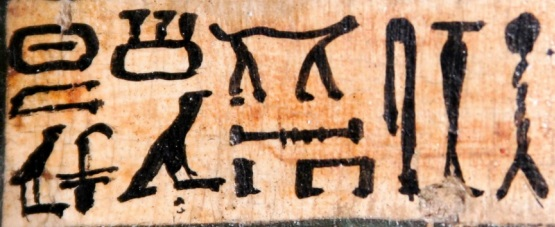
Hieroglyphic inscription of Sha-Amun-en-su's name and title on the sarcophagus

Sha-Amun-en-su was born circa 800 B.C., during the Twenty-second Dynasty of Egypt. Her name and almost all information about her life comes from the hieroglyphic inscriptions in her sarcophagus.

It is known that she was a "singer of Amun's sanctuary", meaning she was a singer with priestly assignments in the service of the Temple of Karnak in the ancient city of Thebes (currently Luxor), devoted to the god Amun. Thebes was one of the most important religious centers in Ancient Egypt, congregating a complex of temples and hundreds of workers, among them priests, scribes, singers, musicians, managers and employees, with Karnak as its main temple.

There were several categories of priestly singers at Amun's shrine. Sha-Amun-en-su belonged to the main group, called Heset, women who exercised ritualistic functions and sang hymns in honor of the god Amun at sacred ceremonies and festivals, either as soloists or accompanied by female choirs. The Heset tradition lasted in Thebes between the 9th to 6th centuries B.C. Besides singing the religious hymns, they were responsible for helping the "God's Wife of Amun" during the temple rites.

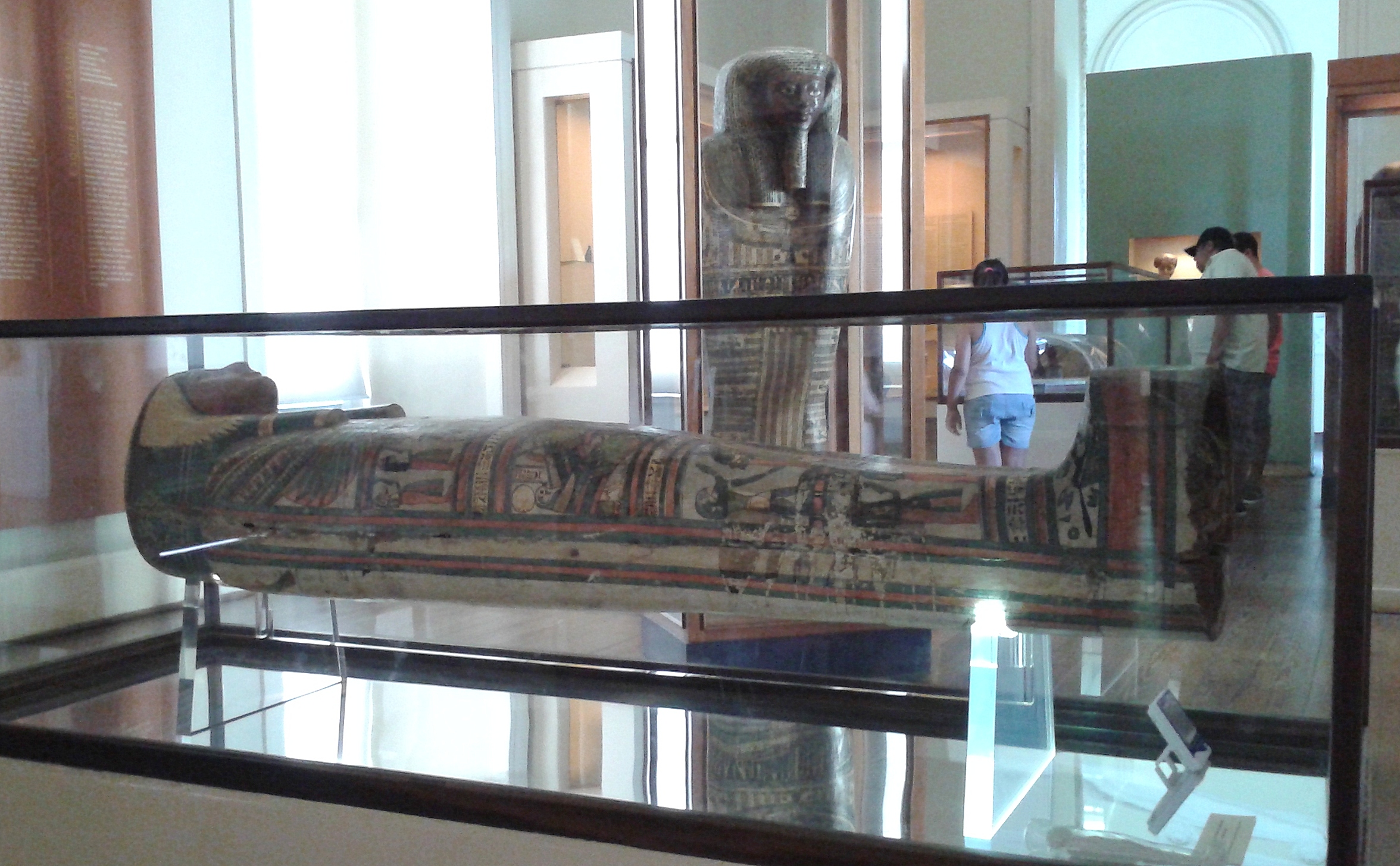
Sha-Amun-en-su's sarcophagus

The Heset were not obliged to live permanently in the temple and many of them attended only for the execution of the ceremonies. Nevertheless, they obeyed to strict codes of conduct. Preferably, they were to remain chaste, but regardless, they were considered pure to such extent as to perform their gifts in an important and symbolic edification as the temple of Amun. Although they were not members of the Egyptian nobility, the singers were chosen among members of local elites and prepared for the function from an early age, being "adopted" by an older singer who served as their tutor and, in fact, as an "adoptive mother".

There is no information about Sha-Amun-en-su's biological family or foster mother. It is likely that, like most Heset, she came from a wealthy family traditionally linked to priestly activities. It is known, however, that she had an "adopted daughter," based on the inscriptions of another sarcophagus currently preserved in the Egyptian Museum in Cairo — the casket of a singer called Merset-Amun, whose hieroglyphs report that she was "daughter of Sha-Amun-en-su, singer of the shrine of Amun". Sha-Amun-en-su lived until around 50 years old, according to researches led by the National Museum's Laboratory of Egyptology. The death causes could not be determined.

== Mummy ==
After the singer's death, her body was mummified by Egyptian priests and placed into a sarcophagus. Sha-Amun-en-su's coffin cover has never been removed, preventing the mummy from being studied by the naked eye. Thus, all analyzes of the coffin's inner structure and mummy status depended on X-ray examinations, computerized tomography, and three-dimensional scans. The set consisting of the sarcophagus and its mummy possessed great historical and scientific value, especially in relation to the knowledge of the funerary practices and rituals of the Temple of Ámon, since mummies of Egyptian singers are rare and even rarer are mummies of singers deposited in sealed coffins.

Some features of the Sha-Amun-en-su mummification process were also quite specific and accentuated its rarity. Although most of the mummification process has followed traditional procedures, such as evisceration of the body and its wrapping with linen bandages, research coordinated by archaeologist Antonio Brancaglion Junior, curator of the Egyptian collection of the National Museum, revealed that the mummy's throat was covered with resin-coated bandages. This particularity indicates a concern of the mummifying priests to protect a zone seen as "vital" for a singer with ritualistic functions that, according to the Egyptian beliefs, would continue using her gift in the afterlife.

The Institute of Oriental Studies at the University of Chicago preserves in its collection another mummy, also in a sealed sarcophagus, called Meresamun ("Amun's beloved", in Egyptian language). Like Sha-Amun-en-su, she was also a singer of the Amun temple during the 22nd Dynasty and her mummy also boasts a kind of protection in her throat. Meresamun was about 30 years old at her death. Her mouth and throat are lined with a padded protection, apparently made with pressed earth and bandages. Based on these common characteristics between the two mummies, Brancaglion hypothesized that there were specific standards of mummification for the women in charge of chanting hymns and songs in the Temple of Karnak.

Anatomical analysis of the Sha-Amun-en-su mummy failed to determine the cause of her death. It is known, anyway, that the singer was around 50 years old when she died. The mummy's body appeared to be in good condition, with no traumas or injuries. The examinations also allowed to observe a very rare dental curiosity: the mummy still kept almost all her teeth, missing only one. The Sha-Amun-en-su mummy also underwent a three-dimensional laser scan coordinated by Jorge Lopes, from the Tri-dimensional Experimentation Nucleus of the Pontifical Catholic University of Rio de Janeiro. That procedure allowed the generation of three-dimensional data files (called "orthogonal coordinates") that served as the basis for making a small-scale replica of the singer's skeleton.

== Funerary artifacts ==
Computed tomography analysis, coordinated by radiologist Iugiro Kuroki, under the supervision of paleopathologist Sheila Mendonça of Fiocruz, identified several amulets with votive functions stored inside the coffin, including a heart-scarab, an artifact related to Egyptian belief in the resurrection of the dead. Sha-Amun-en-su's heart-scarab consisted of a green stone of oval shape, set in a gold plaque and attached to a golden cord, with the name of the singer written in hieroglyphs. These artifacts were often placed on the heart of the mummy and had the function of "replacing" it in cases in which the organ was extracted during the evisceration process. In this way the priests sought to preserve the "integrity" of the deceased in the afterlife, as well as the functions, states, characteristics, and other attributes that ancient Egyptians attached to the heart, such as intelligence and feelings.

== Sarcophagus ==
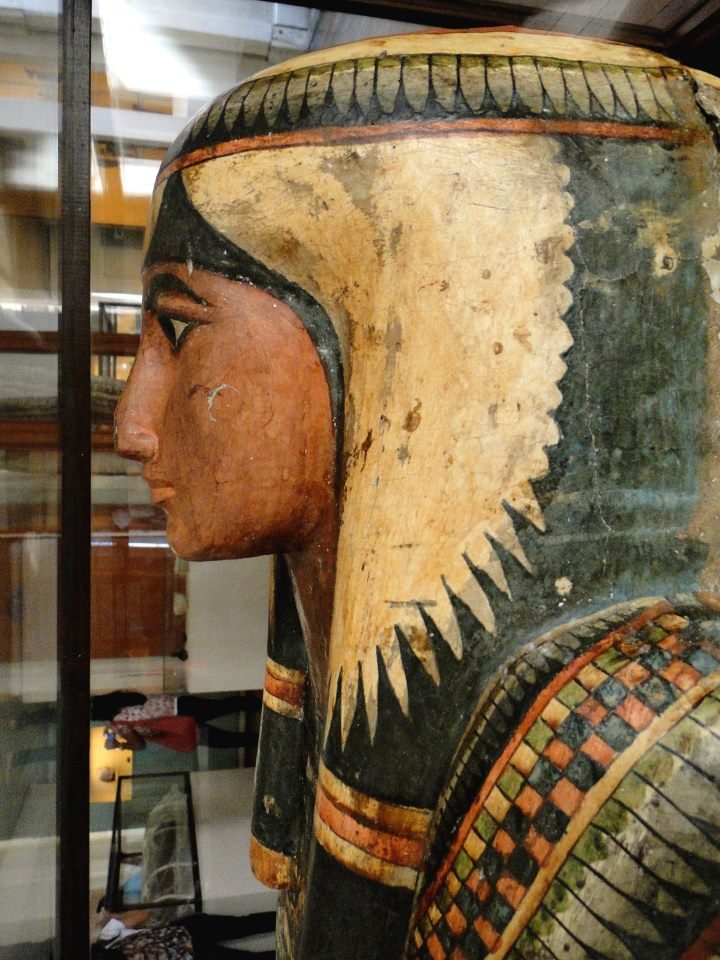
Profile face detail on the sarcophagus of Sha-Amun-in-su.

The Sha-Amun-en-su sarcophagus was composed of box and lid, both carved in polychrome stuccoed wood. It was 1,58 meters high and was made around 750 BC. Throughout its nearly three millennia of history, since it had been sealed with the mummified body of the singer and her votive amulets, the sarcophagus had never been opened. It was a highly representative example of Egyptian funerary art from the 8th and 9th centuries BC, characterized by the profusion of references to Heliopolitan theology.

The top of the sarcophagus cover was decorated with a female face, which sought to represent the natural color of the skin, topped with a blue headdress, decorated with yellow vulture wings and yellow and red ribbons. Shades of dark green, red and yellow stood out against a white background. At the breast height, there was the figure of the goddess Nut and a representation of a ram-headed bird with wings outstretched over the lid, symbolizing protection. The bird's claws and tail were flanked by two uraeus serpents, one with the crown of Upper Egypt and one with the crown of Lower Egypt The four Sons of Horus were represented in two pairs, one pair in front of each snake.On the right side were Imset with a human head and Hapy with a baboon's head, and on the left side Duamutef with a jackal's head and Qebehsenuf with a hawk's head. In the region of the legs were represented the amulets of the god Osiris, flanked by divinities. The two halves of the sarcophagus were separated by the sign Ankh, the symbol of life, which was repeated in two other ribbons. Finally, there was a representation of the singer's Ba - Ba was understood at the same time as a spiritual component of human beings, gods and animals, as a metaphysical principle related to the individuality of being and as a dynamic element that separates from the body after death, approaching, in this sense, the Western concept of soul.

At the back and outside of the sarcophagus was a representation of the great Djed pillar, a sign of stability associated with Osiris, the Egyptian god of the afterlife, who ruled the underworld and the dead. In different parts of the coffin, there were bands with hieroglyphic inscriptions, analyzed and studied by different Egyptologists, such as Kenneth Kitchen and Alberto Childe. Kitchen was the first to identify the mummy, deciphering two bands of distinct hieroglyphs that associated her name to her occupation. The first band bore the inscription "An offering that the king makes [to] Osiris, Chief of the West, great God, Lord of Abydos - made for [?] The Singer of the Shrine [of Ammon], Sha-Amun-en-su". In the second line of hieroglyphs was read: "An offering that the king makes [to] Ptah-Sokar-Osiris, Lord of the [shrine] Shetayet - made for [?] The Singer of the Shrine of Ammon, Sha-Amun-en-su".

== History ==
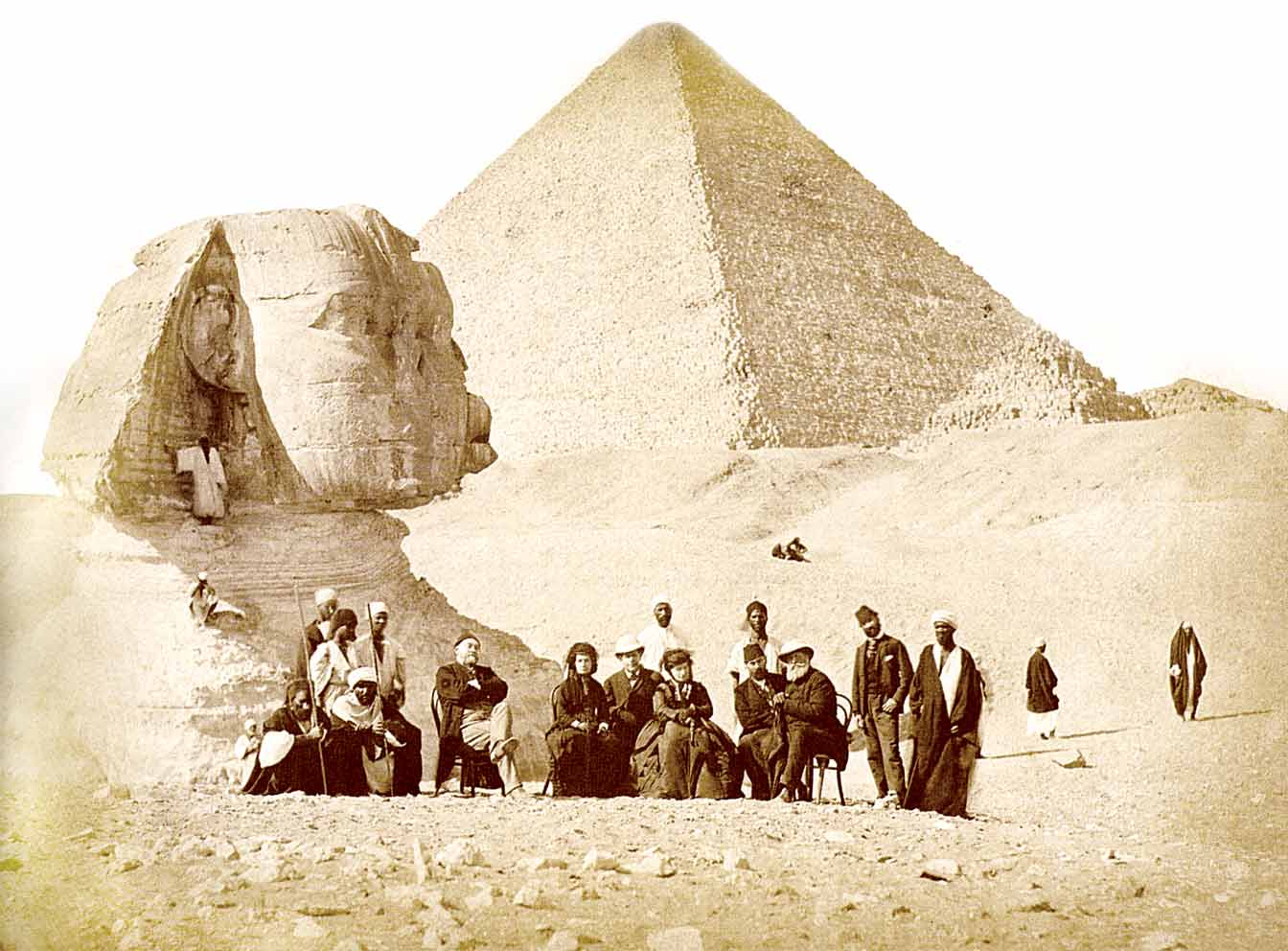
Emperor Pedro II and his entourage visiting the Egyptian pyramids, in 1876.

There is scarce information on the sarcophagus of Sha-Amun-en-su in the pre-nineteenth century period. There is no record of the date or exact archaeological site where the coffin was found (although it is known to come from the vast western Thebes complex), nor is there any information on the process of integrating the coffin into the Egyptian Khedivate collections.

In 1876, during the second visit of Emperor Dom Pedro II to Egypt, the sarcophagus was offered as a gift to the Brazilian monarch by Ismail Pasha. In return, Pedro II offered a book to the Khedive. An amateur Egyptologist and enthusiast of Egyptian culture, Pedro II had a special affection for the sarcophagus, which soon became one of the most relevant pieces of his private collection. The emperor kept him standing in his study in the Palace of São Cristóvão.

During its passage through the collection of Pedro II, the sarcophagus was damaged in the event of a storm. Knocked down by the wind, the sarcophagus fell, crashing into one of the emperor's office windows and having its left side fragmented. It was later restored, but the intervention would remain visible ever since. Other restorations would be carried out in the following decades aiming at eliminating, above all, the threats of termites and wasps, attracted by the oldness of the wood.

The sarcophagus remained in the Palace of São Cristóvão after the Proclamation of the Republic in 1889, and was later integrated into the collection of Egyptian archeology of the National Museum of Rio de Janeiro. Since its integration into the museum collection, the sarcophagus has always been one of the most outstanding pieces of the collection, having served as the basis for a large number of scientific researches, theses and monographs, developed by researchers from the Federal University of Rio de Janeiro and others Brazilian scientific institutions and academics from different parts of the world. In 2015, commenting on the importance and uniqueness of the sarcophagus and the mummy of Sha-Amun-en-su, the curator of the Egyptian National Museum's collection, Antonio Brancaglion Junior, stated:

If you have a mummy, you have a mummy, if you have not, you won't get one anymore. If we lose it, we will never get anything else remotely similar. We have to keep it to the end.

On 2 September 2018, a major fire destroyed the building of the National Museum and much of the collection on display, including the sarcophagus of Sha-Amun-en-su, with its mummy and all the votive artifacts conserved within it. In the fire, the other mummies and sarcophagi of the collection, along with most of the archaeological collection, were also lost. The fire caused great commotion in the academic, scientific and cultural circles of Brazil and the world.

== See also ==
- Collection of funerary steles in the National Museum of Brazil
- Collection of mummies in the National Museum of Brazil

== Bibliography ==
- Bakos, Margaret (2004). Egiptomania : o egito no Brasil. São Paulo: Paris Ed. ISBN 8572442618.
- Marchiori Bakos, Margaret (3 April 2017). Fatos e mitos do antigo Egito. EDIPUCRS. ISBN 978-85-397-0458-3.
- Brancaglion Junior, Antonio. "Revelando o Passado: estudos da coleção egípcia do Museu Nacional". In: Lessa, Fábio de Souza & Bustamente, Regina (2007). Memoria & festa (Rio de Janeiro: Mauad Editora), pp. 75–80. ISBN 8574781789.
