= Soul house =

Egyptian offering trays

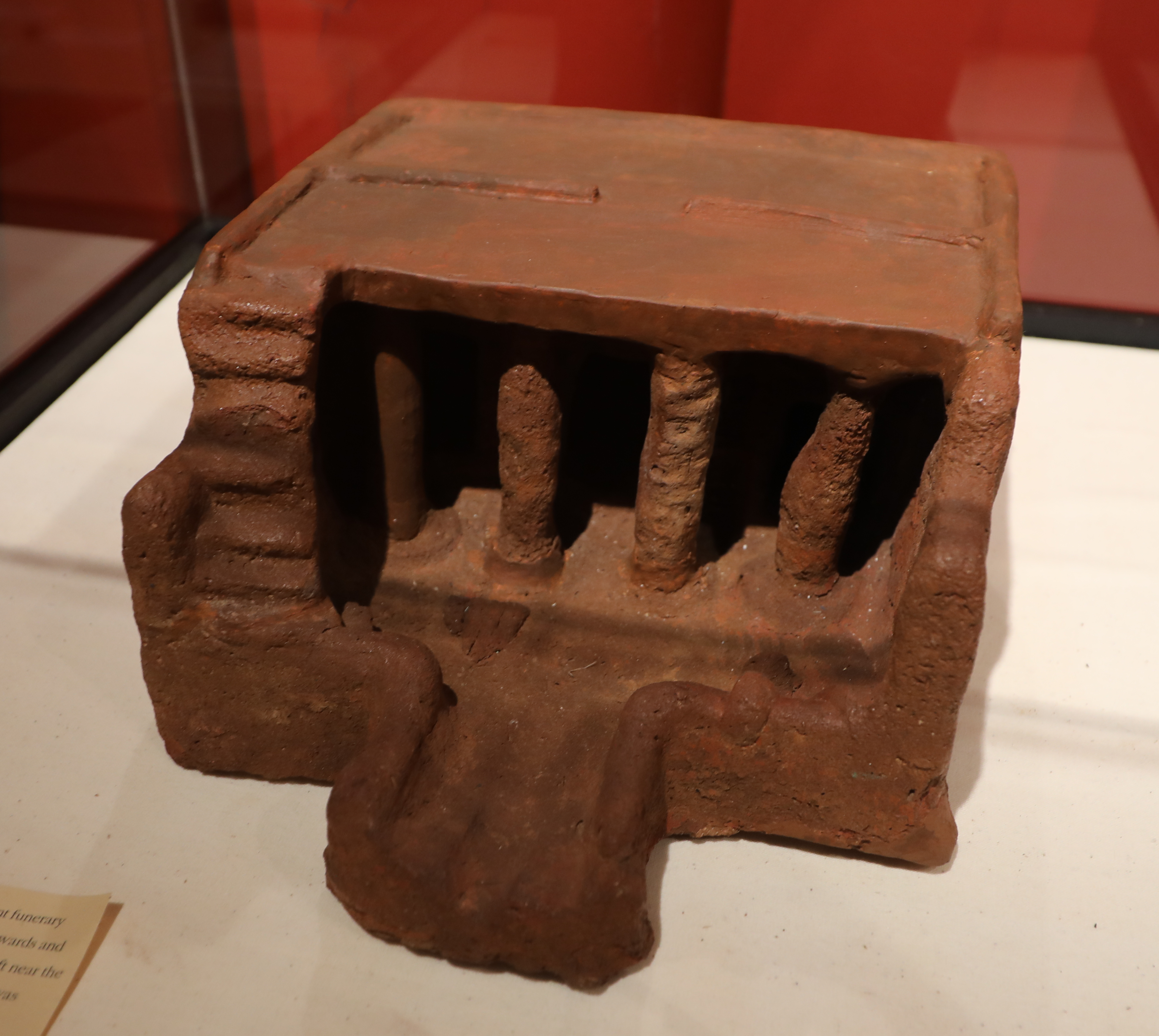
A soul house

Soul houses were pottery offering trays often moulded to include a model of a house that are associated with tombs dating from the Middle Kingdom of Egypt. Designs range from simple trays with no house at all to ones which included a comprehensive model of a house. As well as the house there would be clay depictions of food offerings. Some have spouts allowing liquid to be ritually poured over the soul house and flow away. Many well preserved examples were found at Rifeh.

It has been suggested they were used to mark the tomb on the surface. Another suggestion was that the house was meant to be a place for the dead person’s ka to live although this theory has become less popular over time with the modern view being that the trays were primarily meant to provide food offerings or rather clay models of them.

The model houses have been used as a source for what typical houses of the time would have looked like.

== Method of manufacture ==
Soul houses and offering trays in the Grand Egyptian Museum

An example in the Fitzwilliam Museum was constructed by building clay around a wooden structure before firing.
