= Ann Rosalie David =

British egyptologist

Rosalie David OBE FRSA
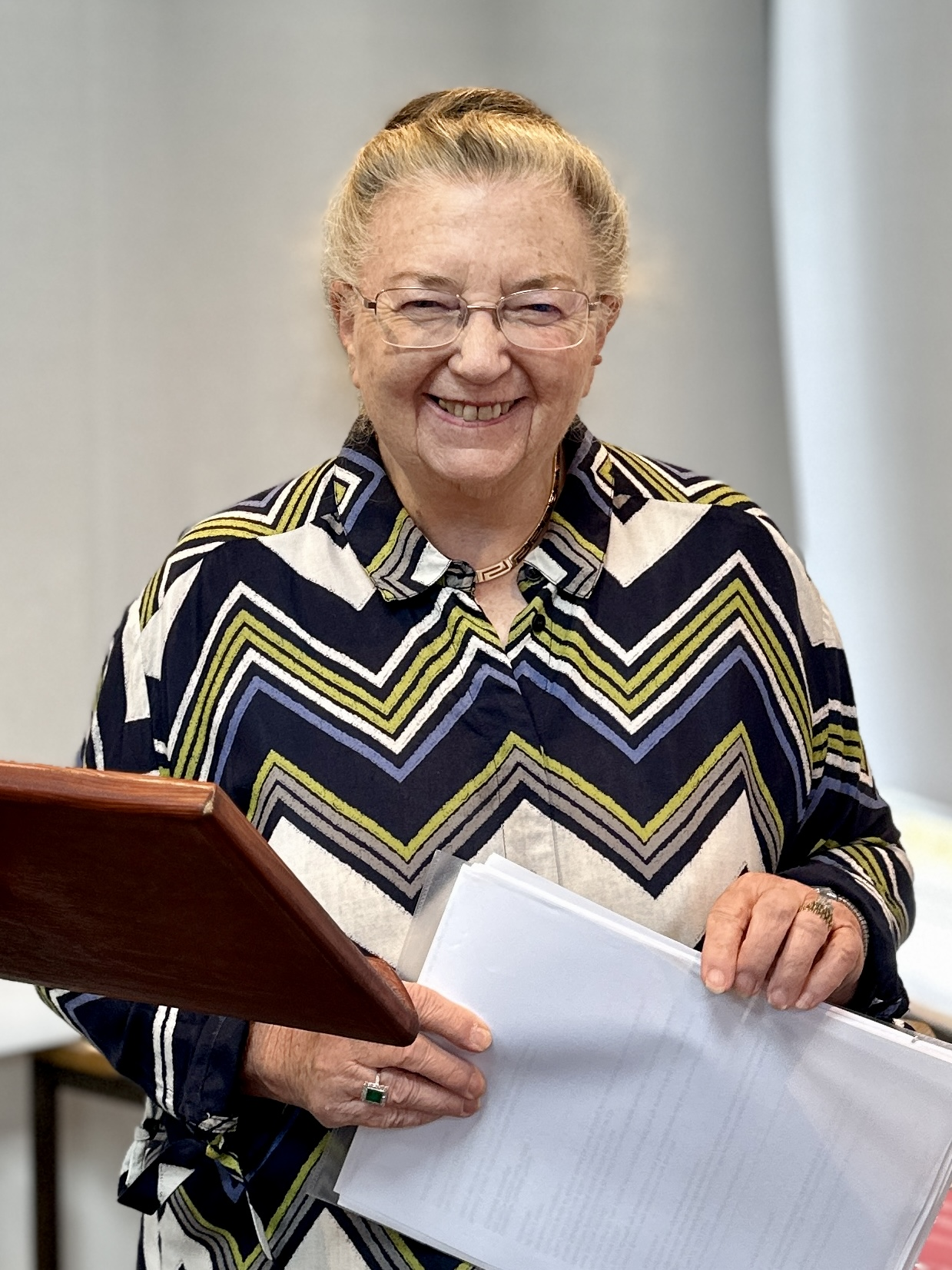
- Rosalie David (2023)
- Born: 30 May 1946 (age 80)

Academic background
- Education: University of Liverpool; University College London
- Thesis: The Temple of Sethod I at Abydos - a study of its decoration and purpose (1971)

Academic work
- Discipline: Egyptology
- Institutions: Manchester Museum; University of Manchester
- Website: www.research.manchester.ac.uk/portal/rosalie.david.html

Ann Rosalie David (born 30 May 1946) is Emeritus Professor of Egyptology at the University of Manchester, where she was the founding Director of the KNH Centre for Biomedical Egyptology in 2003 and was director of the International Mummy Database.

== Early life and education ==
David was born in Cardiff. She was inspired to become an Egyptologist when her teacher showed her a drawing of the pyramids at Abusir. She completed a Bachelor of Arts degree in ancient history at University College London in 1967. She joined the University of Liverpool for her graduate studies, gaining a PhD in 1971. Her thesis considered ancient Egyptian temple rituals.

== Research and career ==
David arrived at the University of Manchester in 1972. She established the Manchester Egyptian Mummy Project at the University of Manchester in 1973. In 1974 she began to give educational talks on Nile cruises. In 1975 she found mummy number 1770, which contained evidence of Guinea Worm Disease. She joined the Manchester Literary and Philosophical Society in 1976. David was the director of the KNH Centre for Biological and Forensic Studies in Egyptology at the University of Manchester for twenty five years. She was the first woman to become a professor of Egyptology. She worked as Keeper of Egyptology at the Manchester Museum. She pioneered biomedical research in Egyptology, studying disease, living conditions, pharmacy and medicine in ancient Egypt. In the late 1990s she established the only Egyptian Mummy Tissue Bank. She directed the Schistosomiasis Investigation Project. She worked in collaboration with the Ministry of Health and Population in Egypt. They found tissues of antibodies against schistosomiasis in the mummies in Manchester. She was awarded the British Council medal at the Anglo-French Medical Society in September 1999. David used Raman spectroscopy to study ancient Egyptian pigments. David was appointed an Officer of the Order of the British Empire (OBE) in the 2003 New Year Honours, "for services to Egyptology".

David is Vice President of the Egypt Exploration Society. David appeared in several film and TV shows about Egypt, working on Mummies: Secrets of the Pharaohs, Private Lives of the Pharaohs and The Story of Science. By studying remains from Ancient Egypt, David found evidence that cancer is a man-made disease caused by modern pollution and diet in 2010. She identified that the rich banquets offered to ancient Egyptian gods could block the arteries of high priests, who took the offerings home from temples for their families. David is an emeritus professor at the University of Manchester, having retired in 2012. She spoke at TEDx King's College London in 2013.

=== Books ===
- David, A. Rosalie (2000). The Experience of Ancient Egypt. London: Routledge. ISBN 978-0415032636.
- The Egyptian kingdoms. Peter Bedrick Books. 1990. ISBN 978-0872262300. OCLC 22332232. ©1988
- Keynes, Milo (November 1985). "Rosalie David & Eddie Tapp (eds): Evidence embalmed—modern medicine and the mummies of Ancient Egypt. Manchester: University Press, 1984. 176 pp. £6.50 (paperback)". Antiquity. 59 (227): 235–236. doi:10.1017/s0003598x0005746x. ISSN 0003-598X. S2CID 163967479.*
- The giant book of the mummy. Lodestar Books. 1993. ISBN 978-0525674139. OCLC 26255932.
- A guide to religious ritual at Abydos. Aris and Philips. 1981. ISBN 978-0856680601. OCLC 757205543.
- The mummy's tale : the scientific and medical investigation of Natsef-Amun, priest in the temple at Karnak. Michael O'Mara. 1992. ISBN 978-1854791351. OCLC 681478153.
- Mysteries of the mummies : the story of the Manchester University investigation. Book Club Associates. 1979. OCLC 52910649.
- The Pyramid Builders of Ancient Egypt : a Modern Investigation of Pharaoh's Workforce. Taylor & Francis. 1997. ISBN 978-1280335389. OCLC 824543033.
- A guide to religious ritual at Abydos. Aris & Phillips. 1981. ISBN 978-0856680601. OCLC 905680441.
- Science in Egyptology. Manchester University Press. 1986. ISBN 978-0719022043. OCLC 905462784.
- Handbook to Life in Ancient Egypt Facts On File, 2003 ISBN 0-8160-5034-1
- A year in the life of ancient Egypt. 16 April 2015. ISBN 9781473859838. OCLC 965484815.
- Egyptian mummies and modern science. Cambridge University Press.

==== About David ====
- Price, Campbell, ed. (2016). Mummies, Magic and Medicine in Ancient Egypt: essays in honour of Rosalie David. Manchester University Press. ISBN 978-1784992439. OCLC 976987828.
