= Katebet =

Ancient Egyptian priestess

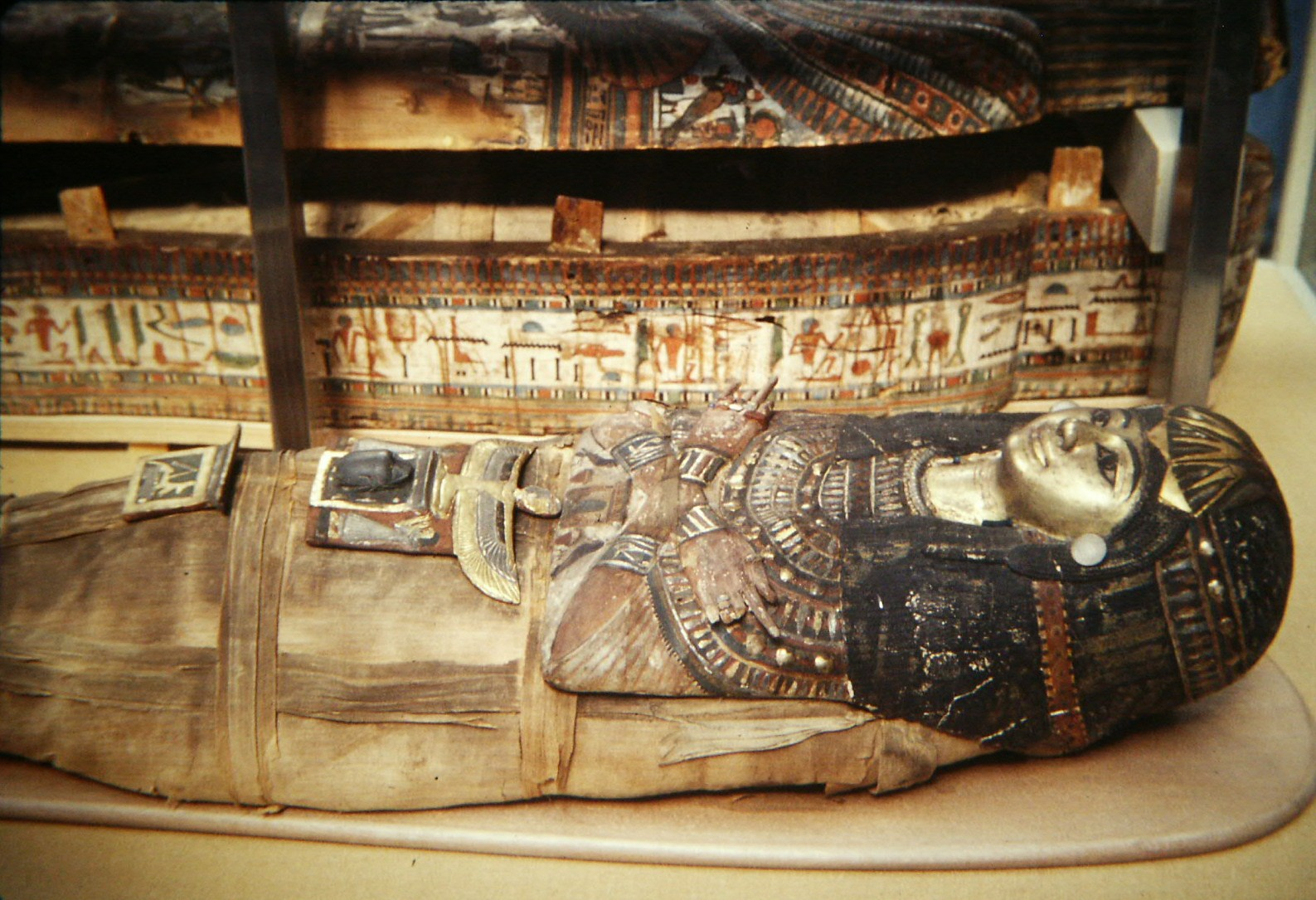
Mummy of Katebet at the British Museum

kA t b t B1
Katebet
in hieroglyphs
Era: New Kingdom
(1550–1069 BC)

Katebet was an Ancient Egyptian priestess at Karnak temple in Thebes, Egypt. She held the title "Chantress of Amun".

Katebet's coffin and mummy were found in Thebes. She died during the late Eighteenth or early Nineteenth Dynasties of Egypt. Radiographic examination of her mummy revealed she was elderly at death. She had lost almost all of her teeth, and had arthritis in her spine.

In 1835, she was acquired at auction from Sotheby's by the British Museum, as part of the third collection assembled by the early Egyptologist and antiquarian Henry Salt.

The shape of the wig and the position of the arms crossed over the chest are unusual for women's coffins in Ancient Egypt. Thus, it is hypothesized that her coffin was originally designed for the burial of a man, and was repurposed for Katebet.

== Coffin ==
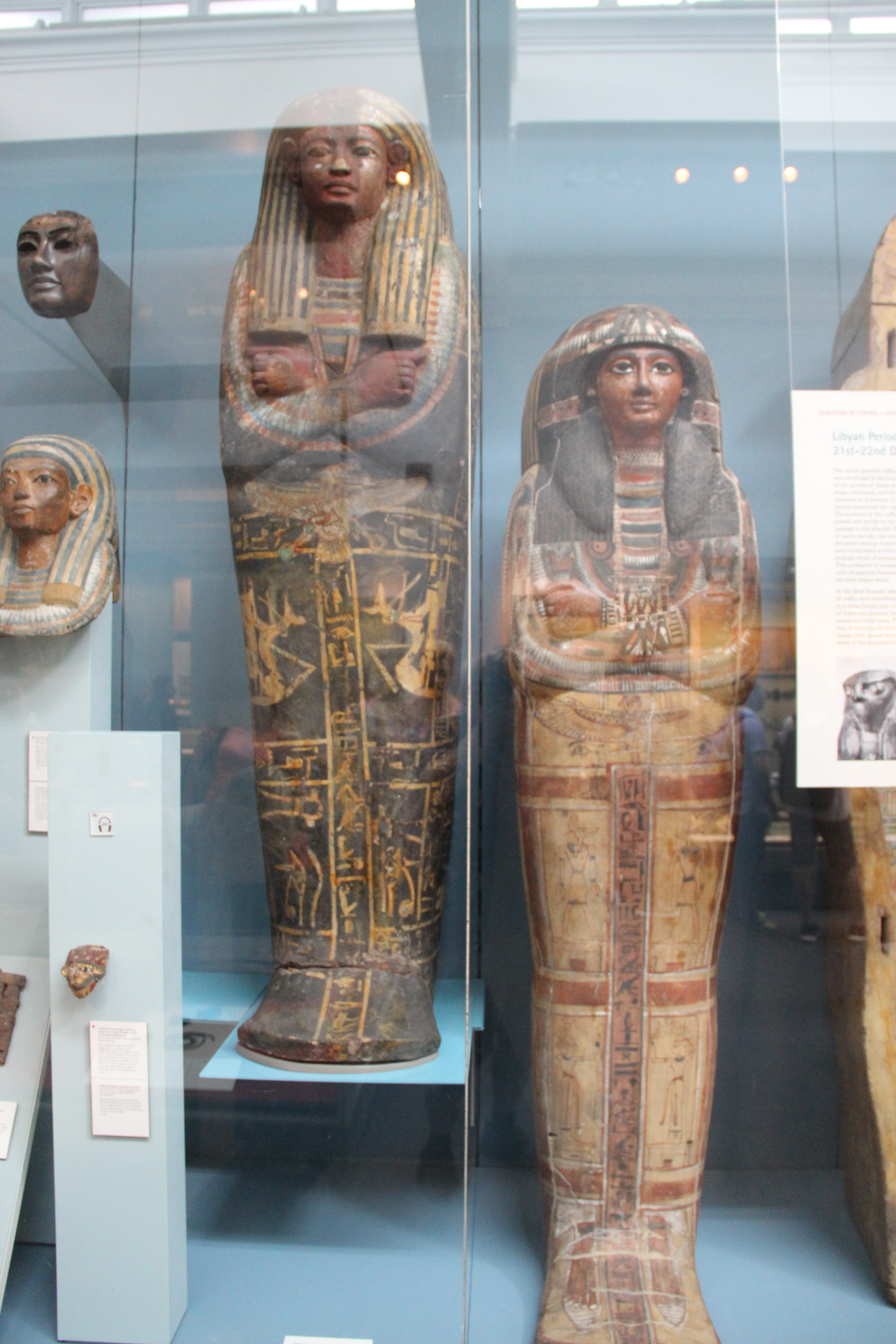
Coffin of Katebet (right)

Katebet's coffin is an early example of the simple "yellow"-type coffin, a style that developed towards the end of the Eighteenth Dynasty, replacing coffins with black-based designs. The coffin lid depicts her wearing ear-studs, a choker, broad collar, bracelets, and a pectoral-necklace. Below this is a central column of hieroglyphic text and three plain horizontal bands; the space between is filled with figures of funerary deities. On the foot of the coffin, her bare feet are depicted emerging from the hem of a white garment.

Her coffin was originally intended for a man, as the carved wig is a masculine style; it was later changed into a feminine wig with paint. This may be because Katebet took over the coffin from a man, possibly her husband, or a mistake made during the coffin's construction, as none of the texts shows signs of alteration.

== Mask and burial goods ==
Katebet's head and chest are covered with a mummy mask made of cartonnage with wooden arms. The face of the mask is gilded. She is depicted wearing white clothing and items of jewellery. Her mask is unusual for including the crossed arms, as well as open hands with separate fingers. The fingers wear real rings made of semi-precious stones such as carnelian. Bracelets are painted on the wrists.

Several other objects were placed on her body. On her chest below the mask was a pectoral with a central scarab. Below this was another, smaller pectoral; an ushabti figure was positioned over her knees. Like, the coffin, these items were not originally made for her. The variety and placement of these burial goods led to the suggestion that the assemblage was made up of several pieces of different ages in the nineteenth century.

== Mummy ==
Katebet's wrapped mummy is 5.5 ft (1.7 m) long. Her shroud is secured by several transverse bands of fabric, which were once coloured but have since faded to brown. She is positioned on her back with her arms extended and her hands flat over the pubic area. Her mummification may have been relatively simple, as her brain was not removed, and large quantities of what appears to be mud were applied to the corpse. Her organs seem to have been removed. Her sternum and some of her ribs have dislocated; she has a curved spine (scoliosis). A ring with a square bezel is present on her left ring finger.
