= 1770 (mummy) =

Egyptian mummy

1770, otherwise known as Mummy 1770 or Mummy No. 1770, was an ancient Egyptian female mummy. The specimen was found in a sarcophagus by Rosalie David, and was approximately 13 or 14 years old at the time of her death. The mummy's legs were not present, and were replaced by wooden planks. Her feet also consisted of sandals filled with mud and reeds, with the tips being substituted for toes. The fingernails and reed tips had golden coverings, which suggested that she lived in a wealthy family.

== Death ==
It was discovered that Mummy 1770 had a calcified male guinea worm in her abdominal wall. Her legs were amputated, one above, one below the knee. It is possible that an unsuccessful treatment of the dracunculiasis was the cause of death. However, it is not known whether her legs were amputated because of this. It is known that mummy 1770 died about two weeks after her surgery.

== Facial reconstruction ==
When the sarcophagus was unwrapped in 1975 by the Manchester Mummy team, including Dr. Rosalie David, believed they may be able to attempt a forensic facial reconstruction. Her skull was incomplete and in many pieces, in order to reconstruct, the team put the skull together, made a plaster cast, and filled the gaps with wax. To create the face, wooden pegs were drilled into the cast, at the precise depth of tissue. Then wax was added to the cast over the pegs, slightly covering them. After the wax was added, glass eyes and a wig were added to the cast. Mummy 1770 was reconstructed twice, one was the 1975 version, the other was a modified version, with darker skin and make up.

External images
- Original reconstruction
- Second reconstruction
