= Mummy of Djed-Amunet-ius-ankh =

Ancient Egyptian mummy

The mummy of Djed-Amunet-ius-Ankh is a mummy from ancient Egypt of a woman named Djed-Amunet-ius-Ankh, who died at the age of between 19 and 20. It dates back to the reign of the 22nd/23rd Dynasty of Egypt, around 2,800 years ago. It is currently on permanent display at the Racibórz Museum on 1 Gimnazjalna Street. The mummy has been the subject of numerous scientific studies and publications, including those by German Egyptologist Karl Richard Lepsius.

== Origins ==
Djed-Amunet-ius-Ankh came from a wealthy family. She was likely born in Memphis around 800 BCE. Her father, Anch-Chonsu, held an unspecified position in Thebes. Her parents named her before her birth. While waiting for her arrival, they visited the oracle of the goddess Amunet. The oracle responded: "She will live". This is the origin of her name – Djed-Amunet-ius-Ankh – which literally means "Amunet says she will live". Very little is known about her life, but it is recorded that after marrying, she received the title of "lady of the estate", which was granted to wealthy married women. It is also known that she became a mother at least twice. She is estimated to have died at the age of between 19 and 20. Her death was likely due to complications during childbirth.

== Mummy and sarcophagi ==
The body of Djed-Amunet-ius-Ankh was embalmed using the method employed for wealthy individuals. The mummification process lasted 70 days. However, before the process began, the body lay in the house for three days to prevent any potential cases of necrophilia. The body was first emptied of its internal organs, and then desiccated using natron. The next step involved stuffing the body with linen soaked in resin. The prepared body was then wrapped in the first layer of bandages and coated with bitumen. Subsequently, the mummy was wrapped in additional layers of bandages, with amulets added to help the deceased gain protection from the gods.

The bandaged body was placed in a cartonnage made of linen and plaster, which was decorated with rich iconography. The head was modeled and surrounded by a wig and a crown. From beneath it, bird legs emerged, holding symbols of resurrection in their claws. Around the neck was a decorative necklace. At the center, the god Amun appeared as a ram-headed bird. From his tail emerged two attacking cobras, guarding a figure of Osiris, depicted twice in the form of a mummy. Behind each Osiris figure, two silhouettes were painted – on one side, a human figure (representing Imset) and a monkey-headed human (Hapi), and on the other, two human figures with the heads of a falcon (Duamutef) and a jackal (Qebehsenuef). These four figures represented the sons of Horus. Below these figures, the bird Re-Horakhty was also depicted. Additionally, the cartonnage featured the goddesses Isis and Nephthys, as well as the gods Horus (twice, in the form of a falcon) and Anubis (twice, as a jackal watching over the deceased). All these deities shown on the cartonnage were meant to protect the deceased.

The cartonnage containing the mummy was placed inside two wooden sarcophagi. Their decoration was much simpler than that of the cartonnage. Both had modeled heads surrounded by a wig, a necklace, and a belt of inscriptions, known as an offering formula. The inner sarcophagus had a painted pectoral near the neck, with the goddess Nut depicted at its bottom. The outer sarcophagus was not decorated with any paintings.

After being embalmed and placed in the cartonnage and two sarcophagi, the body was buried following a ceremonial procession in the chamber tomb. Alongside the deceased, everyday objects and four canopic jars with lids shaped like the heads of the sons of Horus were placed in the tomb. The woman's internal organs were not placed in the canopic jars but instead wrapped around figurines representing the sons of Horus and reinserted into the body. This change in practice during mummification took place during the reign of the 21st Dynasty – prior to this, internal organs were typically placed in canopic jars. This practice continued until the rise of Taharqa of the 25th Dynasty, who returned to the old practices.

== History ==
After the mummification, the sarcophagus and the woman's body remained untouched in the tomb for almost three thousand years. In the mid-19th century, during the period of "mummy mania", it was removed from the tomb and sold. Before being sold, the mummy was not taken out of the cartonnage, nor were the bandages unwound, which increased its value. The purchaser was Baron Anselm von Rothschild, who was traveling through Egypt at the time and owned estates near Racibórz. The mummy was unwrapped in one of his palaces in Šilheřovice. In the 1860/1861 school year, he donated it to the Royal Evangelical Gymnasium in Racibórz, which had its own museum. As is often stated, the baron bought the mummy as a wedding gift for his future wife, but she did not accept the gift, so the aristocrat gave it to the local gymnasium. However, the truth of this story is uncertain.

On 20 November 1909, the mummy was transferred to the Upper Silesian Museum in Gliwice, which committed to its conservation, and for the first time, it was put on display for visitors (in the Racibórz gymnasium, it lacked proper conservation care, and the number of viewers was limited). After World War I, efforts began to establish a museum in Racibórz, and after its creation, the mummy returned to the city in May 1934. In 1937, to enrich the exhibition, the museum authorities borrowed several small items of funerary art from the Egyptian Museum of Berlin, including four canopic urns. Copies of amulets and statues of Egyptian gods were also purchased. During World War II, the mummy along with its sarcophagus was saved, while most of the exhibits from the Berlin museum were lost (including one canopic jar).

After World War II, the mummy left Racibórz twice. On 22 October 1971, it was transported with the cartonnage and sarcophagi to the Warsaw National Museum, from which it returned only after 11 years. In 1983, the mummy was displayed at the Agricultural University of Kraków, where the process of destroying the microorganisms on it was performed. This procedure was repeated in Racibórz on 6 November 1995 by professors Bolesław Smyk and Wiesław Barabasz. The procedure also aimed to preserve the body using ethylene oxide for a period of 10 years. During this time, the display case was also replaced.

== Research ==
The first attempt to describe the mummy was made by Wilhelm König, a teacher at the gymnasium. His extensive description, published by the school's press, has survived to this day:

The mummy is 5 feet and half an inch long and was a woman in life. Her arms are extended along both sides of the body so that her hands rest on her thighs. (…) Regarding the embalming method, it does not belong to the expensive ones but undoubtedly falls into the second class mentioned above, and within that, its lower category. The appearance is not at all beautiful and might be unsettling for a sensitive imagination. It is filled with resins and asphalt and covered with them everywhere.

Because of this, it appears black, and only in a few places where the resin has been removed does it have a dark red-brown appearance. Oil was also used in its preparation, as indicated by a dirty-white coating in some places that can be wiped away. (…) Initially, it had a penetrating smell, as did the bandages in which it was wrapped. Currently, the odor has significantly diminished. It is notable that while in the few places free of resin, the skin seems to adhere directly to the bones and the whole body appears to have been consumed by salts and other substances, on the right foot, which was damaged during unwrapping (I was not present at that time), the muscles of the broken big toe and the second toe are completely preserved. They are brown-yellow, very fibrous, and resemble rotten wood. Initially, they were greasy to the touch but are now dry. The big toenail is glossy black, but at the base, it is red. During unwrapping, the last bandages were difficult to remove and did not come off entirely, as they had fused with the resin into a single mass. That is why remnants of them are still visible everywhere. The internal organs were probably removed through the abdominal cavity, as there is a visible opening 3 inches long and 2 inches wide. The mummy is very heavy, hard, and not easily breakable.

As for the head, although all its parts are well preserved, the nose is damaged, and the facial features are distorted – the temple is heavily indented, the forehead is clearly receded, the eyelids are not closed, and there are no eyelashes. However, the left eyebrow hairs are still visible, though heavily coated with resin. The right eyebrow is no longer recognizable. The nose is small, blunt, and slightly upturned. Above it, the resin is blistered and somewhat crushed. The nostrils are wide and large. The nasal septum is preserved, but the ethmoid bone is destroyed. Thus, a wire can be inserted through the nasal cavity into the skull cavity, which is empty and not filled with resin. How the brain was removed remains unclear. Since the ethmoid bone is destroyed, it was probably extracted through the nose, a common practice. The mouth protrudes significantly forward, and the chin is very recessed. The lower lip is thick and extends beyond the narrow edge of the upper lip. The small ears are set low and stick out from the head. The cheekbones are very prominent, and the entire skull appears compressed from the sides. (…) The head still has a lot of hair, though most of it is clumped together with the resin. However, in three places, long curls fall down, and they are not woolly like those of Africans. The hair is dark brown with a reddish sheen in the light. The mummy’s body likely belongs to the Ethiopian race. (…)

The bandages and linen in which the mummy was tightly wrapped are of the same quality as those generally found on other mummies, both in color (our mummy’s are Nankin-colored) and in the large quantity and length of the bandages (some were 17.5 feet long and half a foot wide, wrapped along the entire body). The wrapping technique was also delicate and skillful. Very wide pieces of linen were found. On the first bandage covering the chest, several small figurines were placed; four of them, each two inches long, were intact, while the others were broken, among them a sacred scarab.

The first scientific examination of the mummy was conducted in the 19th century by Prof. Karl Richard Lepsius. He explained the meaning of the iconography and translated the hieroglyphic inscriptions. However, he was unable to decipher the woman's name, concluding that it had been permanently erased (the name was later identified by researcher Albertyna Dembska). He did, however, determine her second name as Tet-Ament-aus-anch. At the beginning of the 20th century, Prof. Woldemar Schmitt from Copenhagen examined the mummy and estimated her age at around 20 years.

In the early 1980s, Dr. Andrzej Niwiński described the cartonnage as Theban, dating from the 22nd/23rd Dynasty. In 1983/1984, Krzysztof Syrek, a student at the Academy of Fine Arts in Kraków, conserved and documented the cartonnage as part of his diploma work and reinterpreted its iconography. Also in 1983, microbiological and toxicological tests were conducted under the supervision of Prof. Bolesław Smyk at the Department of Microbiology of the Agricultural Academy of Kraków. These tests identified 13 species of bacteria and Actinomycetota, as well as six species of fungi. It was determined that all these microorganisms had a harmful effect on the bandages and the substances preserving the mummy. Based on this expertise, a procedure was carried out to remove the living microflora from the mummy.

The most thorough examination of the hieroglyphs and iconography to date was conducted in 1990 by students of the Institute of Oriental Studies at the University of Warsaw under the direction of Prof. Albertyna Dembska. In 2000, an X-ray examination was performed, which indicated that the woman most likely died due to complications during childbirth.

== Exhibition ==
Since 1983, the mummy has been part of a permanent exhibition at the Racibórz Museum titled In the House of Osiris, created by cultural animator and local government activist Marek Rapnicki.

The exhibition is housed in a separate room designed to resemble an Egyptian burial chamber. The mummy itself is wrapped in its original bandages up to the shoulders and displayed in a glass case equipped with silica gel containers to reduce humidity. The cartonnage and two sarcophagi are displayed separately. The entire exhibition aims to illustrate the final phases of mummification, including the wrapping of the body and its placement in the cartonnage and sarcophagi. It is one of the museum's main attractions and is among the few Egyptian mummies in Poland – the others are located in Warsaw, Kraków, and Wrocław.

== Bibliography ==
- Chojecki, D. (2000). W domu Ozyrysa [In the House of Osiris] (in Polish). Racibórz: Muzeum w Raciborzu. ISBN 83-908484-2-2.
- Wawoczny, G. (1998). Tajemnice Raciborza [The Secrets of Racibórz] (in Polish). Racibórz: Nowiny Raciborskie. ISBN 83-901974-6-4.
