= Christiane Desroches Noblecourt =

French Egyptologist (1913–2011)

- Christiane Desroches Noblecourt
- Born: Christiane Desroches; 17 November 1913; Paris
- Died: 23 June 2011 (aged 97); Paris
- Occupation: Egyptologist
- Spouse: André Noblecourt
- Children: 1
- Parents: Louis Desroches (father); Madeline Girod (mother)

Christiane Desroches Noblecourt (French pronunciation: [kʁistjan dɛʁɔʃ nɔbləkuʁ]; 17 November 1913 – 23 June 2011) was a French Egyptologist. She was the author of many books on Egyptian art and history and was also known for her role in the International Campaign to Save the Monuments of Nubia from flooding caused by the Aswan Dam.

== Background ==
She was born Christiane Desroches on 17 November 1913, in Paris, daughter of Louis Desroches (lawyer) and Madeleine Girod. In 1922 she was fascinated by Howard Carter’s discovery of the tomb of Tutankhamun, and encouraged by priest and scholar, Father Étienne Drioton, she joined the Egyptian Antiquities department at the Louvre. She studied Egyptology at École du Louvre and received a Diploma in Archaeology in 1935 under Étienne Drioton and Charles Boreux. In 1937, she received her PhD in philology from the École Pratique des Hautes études of the Sorbonne, under Gustave Lefebvre, Alexandre Moret and Raymond Weill. She was the first woman to be a fellow of the French Institute of Oriental Archaeology (IFAO), and was also the first woman to lead an archaeological dig, in 1938. She excavated at the IFAO sites at Edfu, Deir el-Medina, Medamud and Karnak North from 1938 to 1940.

In 1940, during World War II, she returned to Paris and joined the Resistance, hiding the Louvre's Egyptian treasures in free areas of France. In December 1940, she was arrested at Moulins but was freed after three days. In 1942, she married André Noblecourt, an engineer, and later security advisor to the national museums of France, International Council of Museums (ICOM) and UNESCO. They had one son.

She died on 23 June 2011 at 97. She is buried in Mondement-Montgivroux cemetery in France.

== UNESCO Campaign to Save the Temples ==
Desroches Noblecourt was a leading figure in the campaign for the preservation of ancient Nubian temples from flooding caused by the new Aswan High Dam. With the existing dam's capacity not meeting the needs of Egypt's ever-growing population, in 1954 the government of Gamal Abdel Nasser decided to build a new dam. The monuments of ancient Nubia would have been flooded if the project had gone ahead as planned.

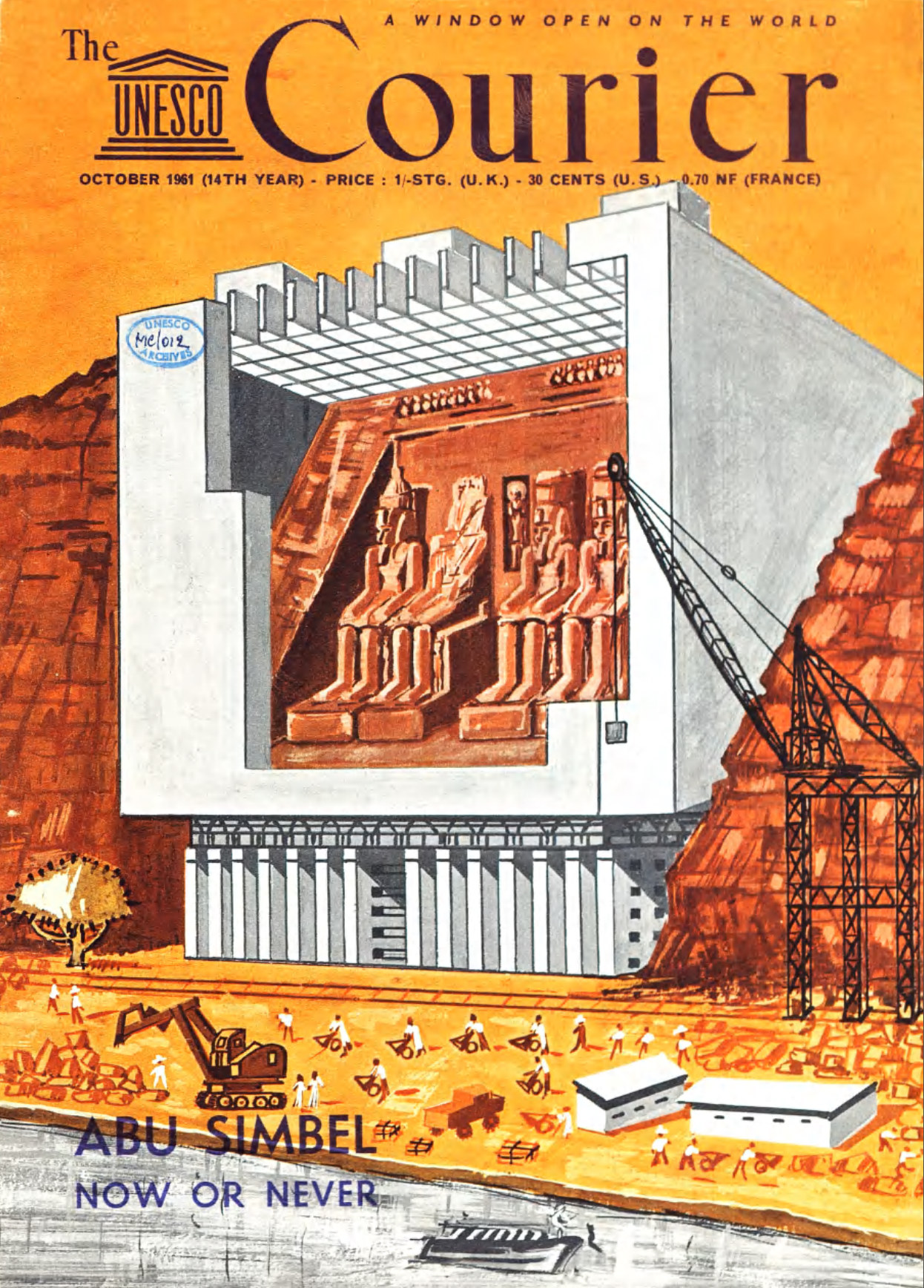
October 1961 UNESCO Courier, focused on the International Campaign to Save the Monuments of Nubia including an article by Desroches Noblecourt entitled Floating Laboratories on the Nile

Mustafa Amer, head of the Antiquities Service, set up the Centre des études et de documentation d’archéologie égyptienne (CEDAE), and in 1954, reportedly Amer sent a telegram and letter to UNESCO in Paris suggesting as a possible archive specialist for the new Centre, one of which was Desroches Noblecourt, then curator of Egyptian antiquities at the Louvre. Desroches Noblecourt was chosen as the UNESCO's advisor to the CEDAE and she arrived in Cairo in November 1954 . Amer stated that he never suggested Desroches Noblecourt but they worked well together. They began with the recording of the Tombs of the Nobles at Luxor, but in early 1955, Desroches Noblecourt reported back to UNESCO that the potential flooding of the monuments of ancient Nubia by the new Aswan High Dam were of immediate importance. In 1959, Desroches Noblecourt encouraged Sarwat Okasha, the Egyptian Minister of Culture to ask UNESCO for its support. Later that year both the Sudanese and Egyptian governments requested UNESCO's support and together they launched the twenty-two year campaign to save the temples of ancient Nubia.

Fifty countries contributed funds to save the monuments. The Temple of Amada was a difficult case, because of its small, beautifully painted reliefs. Desroches Noblecourt announced that France would save it. However, more funds were needed for this project. To this end Desroches Noblecourt requested an interview with Charles de Gaulle, who had no idea of the commitment she had made in the name of her country. Reportedly on learning of it, he demanded, “Madame, how dare you say that France will save the temple, without authorization from my government?” Noblecourt replied, “General, how dare you make an appeal on the radio without authorization from Pétain?” De Gaulle agreed to honour Noblecourt's promise.

Ultimately the rescue project, including the transportation and reconstruction of the temples on their new sites, took over twenty years. Desroches Noblecourt and France's role in the International Campaign to Save the Monuments of Nubia saw an improvement in Franco-Egyptian relations, which had been poor since the Suez Crisis of 1956. Desroches Noblecourt organized several exhibitions with objects traveling from Egypt, some for the first time, namely the Tutankhamun exhibition at the Louvre in 1967 and Ramses II in 1976. In 1972, in recognition of France's contributions to the International Campaign to Save the Monuments of Nubia, the government of Anwar Sadat gave to the Louvre the bust of Amenhotep IV (Akhenaten).

== Exhibition of Tutankhamun and His Times ==
In 1963, Desroches Noblecourt published Tutankhamen: Life and Death of a Pharaoh, and in the years following, as head of Egyptian Antiquities at the Louvre, Desroches Noblecourt organised the Tutankhamun exhibition in 1967. The exhibition entitled "Tutankhamun and His Times" was visited by over a million people. The proceeds from the exhibition went to the Abu Simbel rescue fund, totaling nearly US$500,000. The exhibition was bigger, with more objects from the tomb, than had previously toured North America and Japan. Desroches Noblecourt negotiated the objects that would form the exhibition, and they included the gold mask of Tutankhamun, marking the first time it entered Europe.

== Ramses II ==
In May 1976, there was an exhibition of Ramses II at the Grand Palais, and by September it had had over 650,000 visitors. In September 1976, Ramses II's mummified body flew into Paris, accompanied from Cairo by Desroches Noblecourt, where it underwent testing at Musée de l'Homme at Trocaclero, a branch of the Paris Museum of Natural History. Desroches Noblecourt, Prof. Lionel Baloud, the head of the Musée de l'Homme, and Colette Roubet later published the study La momie de Ramsès II in 1985.

== Awards and honours ==
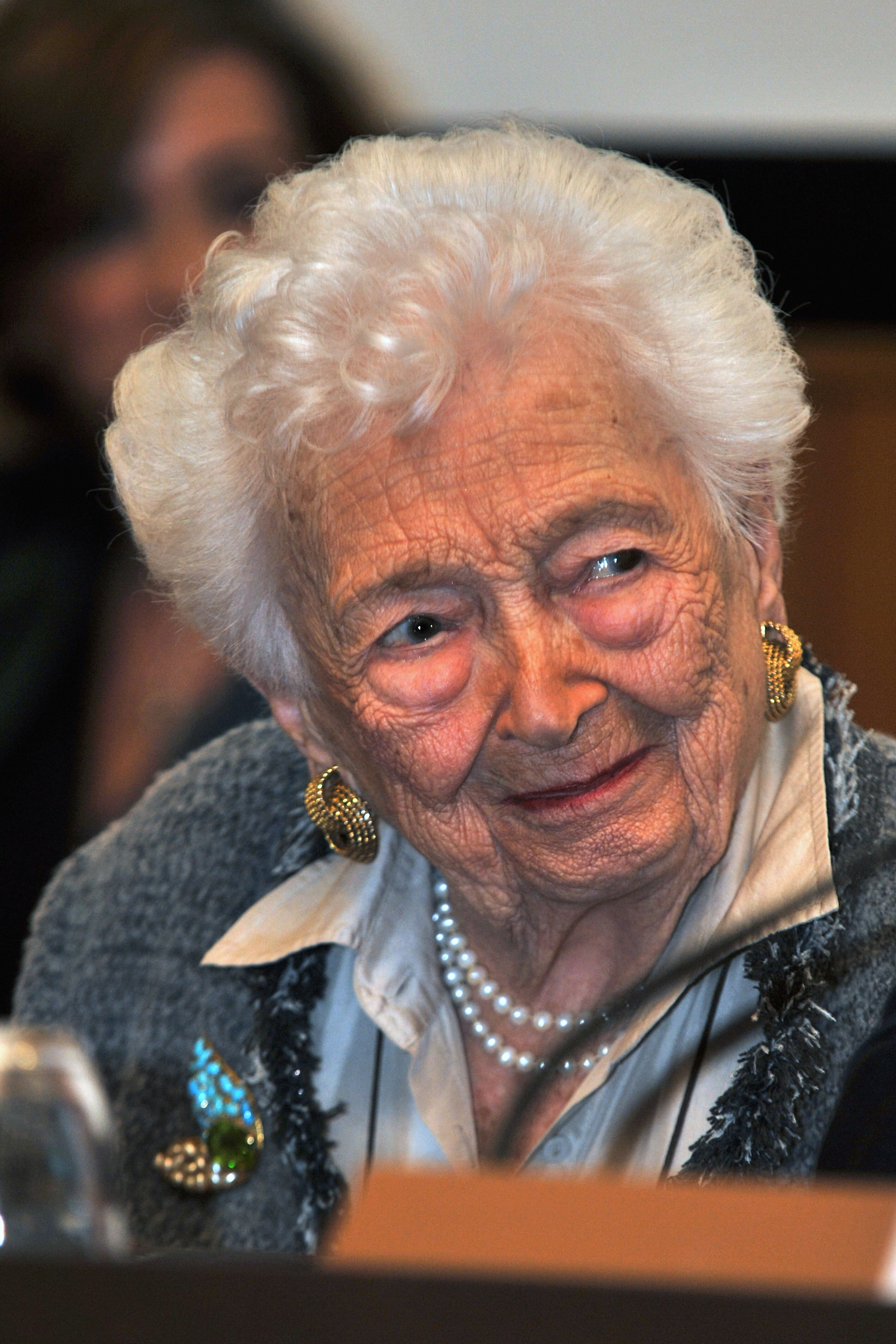
Christiane Desroches Noblecourt at UNESCO headquarters in Paris, 2009.

Christiane Desroches Noblecourt has been awarded several prestigious honours, including in 1975 the gold medal of the French National Center for Scientific Research (CNRS), and in January 2008, the Grand Cross of the Légion d'honneur, the highest decoration in France, During her lifetime, she was awarded:

=== Decorations ===
- Resistance Medal (1946)
- Order of Merit of Egypt, Second Class (13 March 1968, then the United Arab Republic)
- Commander of the Order of Academic Palms (1976)
- Commander of the Order of Arts and Letters (1981; Officer: 1 March 1966)
- Grand Officer of the National Order of Merit (13 May 1996)
- Grand Cross of the Legion of Honour (30 January 2008; Grand Officer: 18 February 2005; Commander: 4 July 1978; Knight: 1953)

=== Academic and cultural recognition ===
- Vermeil Medal of the City of Paris (1967)
- Silver Medal of Archaeology of the Academy of Architecture (1975)
- Corresponding Member of the Academy of Sciences and Letters of Montpellier (1978)
- Honorary PhD from Institut Catholique
- Great Silver Medal of UNESCO
- Great Gold Medal of the Society for Encouraging Progress

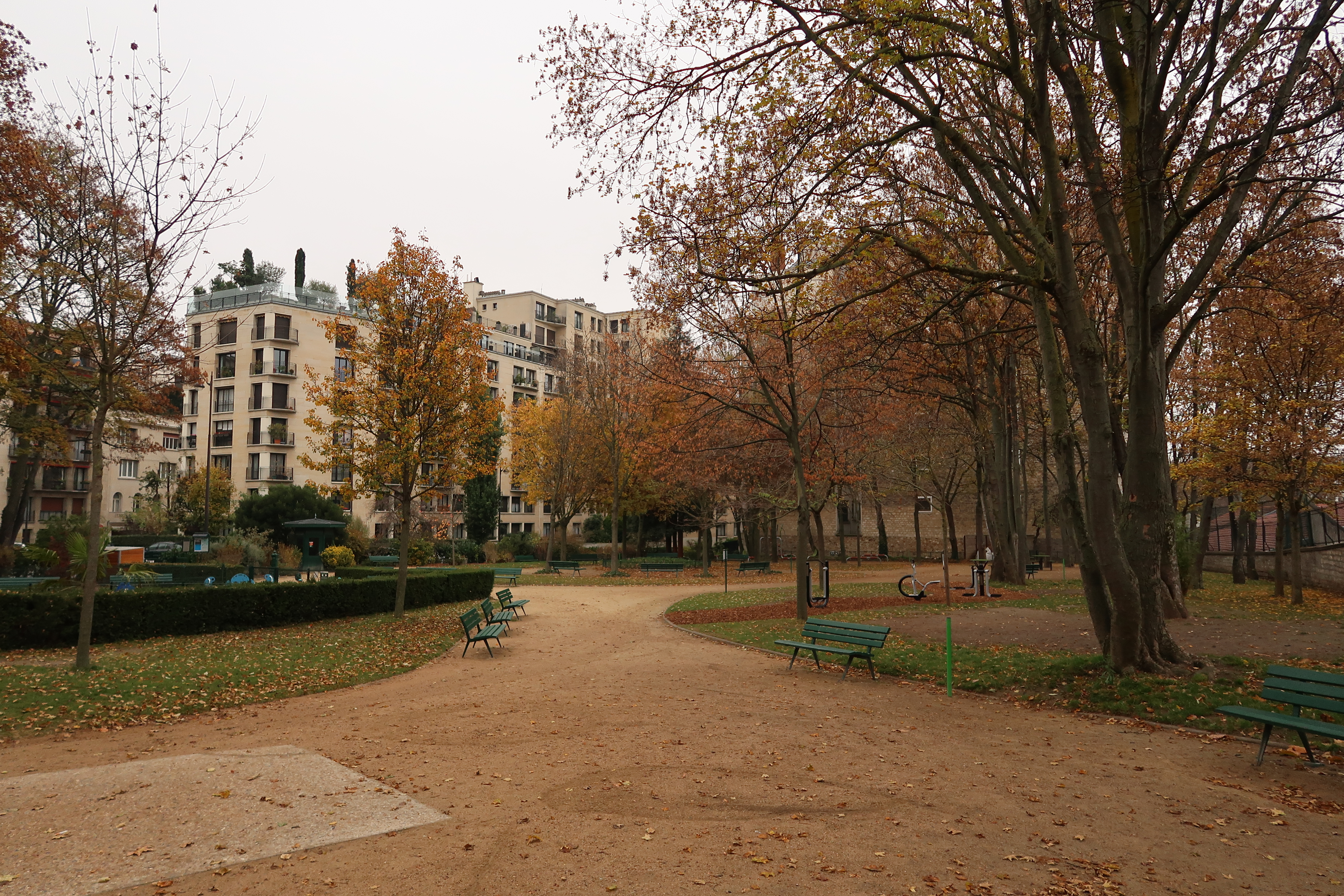
Jardin Christiane-Desroches-Noblecourt, Paris

In May 2016, the former garden of Place Rodin was renamed Jardin Christiane-Desroches-Noblecourt in Desroches Noblecourt's honour.

== Publications ==
Desroches Noblecourt published dozens of books, articles, book chapters and reports throughout her career. A number of her books were translated into several languages and reprinted multiple times.

=== Books ===
- L'art égyptien au Musée du Louvre. (1941). Paris: Floury
- Le style égyptien. (1946). Arts, styles et techniques. Paris: Larousse.
- L'ancienne Égypte: l'extraordinaire aventure amarnienne. (1960). Photographs by F. L. Kenett. Histoire mondiale de la sculpture. Paris: Les Deux-Mondes.
- Peintures des tombeaux et des temples égyptiens. (1962). Le Grand art en livre de poche. Paris: Flammarion.
- Vie et mort d'un pharaon, Toutânkhamon. (1963). Paris: Hatchette.
- Toutankhamon et son temps. (1967). Paris: Réunion des Musées Nationaux.
- Le grand Pharaon Ramsès II et son Temps. (1985). Montréal: Palais de la Civilisation Montréal.
- Les zélateurs de Mandoulis et les maîtres de Ballana et de Qustul. (1985). Mélanges Gamal Eddin Mokhtar. Cairo: IFAO.
- La femme au temps des pharaons. (1986 and 2001). Paris: Stock.
- La grande Nubiade ou le parcours d'une égyptologue. (1992). Paris: Stock. ISBN 2-7242-7128-9
- Amours et fureurs de la lointaine. (1995). Paris: Stock.
- Ramsès II, la véritable histoire. (1997). Paris: Pygmalion. ISBN 2-7441-0425-6
- Toutânkhamon. (1999). Paris: Pygmalion.
- Le secret des temples de la Nubie. (1999). Paris: Stock.
- La reine mystérieuse: Hatshepsout. (2002). Paris: Pygmalion. ISBN 978-2-7441-5818-6
- Symboles de l'Égypte. (2004). Paris: Desclée de Brouwer. ISBN 978-2-253-12248-7
- Le fabuleux héritage de l'Égypte. (2004). Paris: Télémaque. ISBN 978-2-266-15427-7
- Le secret des découvertes. (2006). Paris: Télémaque. ISBN 978-2-266-22332-4
- Ramses II: an illustrated biography. (2007). Paris: Flammarion. ISBN 978-2-08-030043-0
- Gifts from the pharaohs: how Egyptian civilization shaped the modern world. (2007). Paris: Flammarion. ISBN 978-2-08-030562-6

=== Co-authored books ===
- Michalowski, K., Desroches Noblecourt, C. and de Linage, J. (1950). Tell-Edfou 1939. Fouilles Franco-polonaises, III. Cairo: IFAO.
- Desroches Noblecourt, C. and de Bourguet, P. (1962). L'art égyptien. Paris: PUF.
- Desroches Noblecourt, C. and Kuentz, C. (1968). Le petit temple d'Abou Simbel, 2 vol. Cairo: Centre de documentation et d'étude sur l'ancienne Égypte.
- Aldred, C, de Cenival, J-L, Debono, F., Desroches Noblecourt, C., Lauer, J-P., Leclant, J. and Vercoutter, J. (1978). Les Pharaons, Le temps des pyramides. L'univers des formes, Collection Créée par André Malraur. Paris: Gallimard.
- Aldred, C., Barguet, P., Desroches Noblecourt, C., Leclant, J. and Müller, H. W. (1979). Les Pharaons, L'empire des conquérants. L'univers des formes, Collection Créée par André Malraur. Paris: Gallimard.
- Aldred, C., Daumas, F., Desroches Noblecourt, C. and Leclant, J. (1980). Les Pharaons, L'Égypte du crépuscule. L'univers des formes, Collection Créée par André Malraur. Paris: Gallimard.
- Desroches Noblecourt, C. and Vercoutter, J. (1981). Un siècle de fouilles françaises en Égypte 1880-1980, Cairo: IFAO.
- Balout, L., Roubet, C. and Desroches Noblecourt, C. (1985). La momie de Ramsès II, Paris: Museum national d'histoire naturelle.
- Desroches Noblecourt, C. with David, C., Franco, I., and de Tonnac, J-P (2003). Sous le regard des dieux. Paris: Albin Michel.

=== Select articles and chapters ===
- Desroches, C. (1938). Un modèle de maison citadine du Nouvel Empire (Musée du Louvre No. E. 5357). Revue d'égyptologie 3, 17–25.
- Desroches-Noblecourt, C. (1947). Une coutume égyptienne méconnue. Bulletin de l'Institut Français d'Archéologie Orientale 45, 185–232.
- Desroches Noblecourt, C. (1951). Deux grands obélisques précieux d'un sanctuaire à Karnak: les Égyptiens ont-ils érigé des obélisques d'électrum? Revue d'égyptologie 8, 47–61.
- Desroches-Noblecourt, C. (1967). Exposition Toutankhamon et son temps au Petit Palais. Revue du Louvre: la revue des musées de France 17, 13–26.
- Desroches Noblecourt, C. (1991). Les trois saisons du dieu et le débarcadère du ressuscité. Mitteilungen des Deutschen Archäologischen Instituts, Abteilung Kairo 47, 67–80.
- Desroches-Noblecourt, C. (1995). A propos de la nouvelle tombe de la Vallée des Rois, Archéologia 314, 4–6
- Desroches Noblecourt, C. (1996). Les déesses et le sema-taouy. In Der Manuelian, Peter (ed.), Studies in honor of William Kelly Simpson 1, 191–197. Boston: Museum of Fine Arts.
- Desroches-Noblecourt, C. (1997). La monture de l'enfant divin. In Phillips, Jacke (ed.), Ancient Egypt, the Aegean, and the Near East: studies in honour of Martha Rhoads Bell 1, 169–178. San Antonio: Van Siclen Books.
- Desroches-Noblecourt, C. (2003). À propos des piliers héraldiques de Karnak: une suggestion. Cahiers de Karnak 11 (2), 387–403

== See also ==
- Aswan Dam
- List of Egyptologists
