= Temple of Edfu =

Ancient Egyptian temple, located on the west bank of the Nile in Edfu, Upper Egypt

Coordinates: 24°58′40″N 32°52′24″E

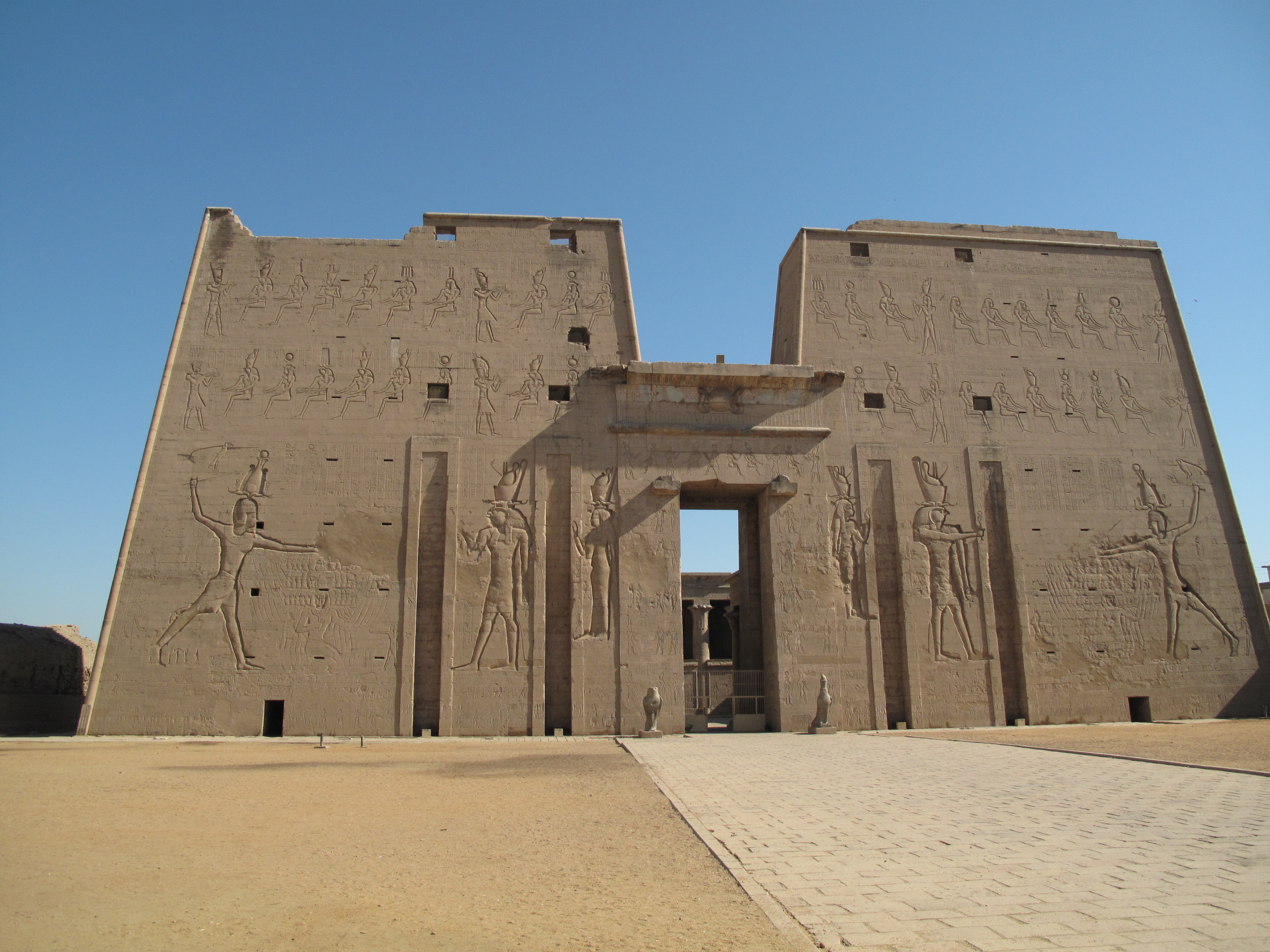
- The main entrance of Edfu Temple showing the first pylon

Monument information
- Type: Temple
- Location: Egypt
- Nome: Wetjes-Hor
Hieroglyphic name
bH d t niwt
(Bḥd.t)
- Deity: Horus (primary), Hathor, Harsomtus

Historical information
- Period: Graeco-Roman Period
- Dynasty: Ptolemaic dynasty
- Construction start date: August 23, 237 BC
- Completion date: 57 BC; 2083 years ago

Architectural description
- Construction material: Sandstone
- Height: 36 meters
- Width: 3 76 meters
- Length: 79 meters

The Temple of Edfu is an Egyptian temple located on the west bank of the Nile in Edfu, Upper Egypt. The city was known in the Hellenistic period in Koine Greek as Ἀπόλλωνος πόλις and in Latin as Apollonopolis Magna, after the chief god Horus, who was identified as Apollo under the interpretatio graeca. It is one of the best preserved shrines in Egypt. The temple was built in the Ptolemaic Kingdom between 237 and 57 BC. The inscriptions on its walls provide important information on language, myth and religion during the Hellenistic period in Egypt. In particular, the Temple's inscribed building texts "provide details of its construction, and also preserve information about the mythical interpretation of this and all other temples as the Island of Creation." There are also "important scenes and inscriptions of the Sacred Drama which related the age-old conflict between Horus and Seth." They are translated by the Edfu-Project.

== History ==
Edfu was one of several temples built during the Ptolemaic Kingdom, including the Dendera Temple complex, Esna, the Temple of Kom Ombo, and Philae. Its size reflects the relative prosperity of the time. The present temple, which was begun "on 23 August 237 BC, initially consisted of a pillared hall, two transverse halls, and a barque sanctuary surrounded by chapels." The building was started during the reign of Ptolemy III Euergetes and completed in 57 BC under Ptolemy XII Auletes. It was built on the site of an earlier, smaller temple also dedicated to Horus, although the previous structure was oriented east–west rather than north–south as in the present site. A ruined pylon lies just to the east of the current temple; inscriptional evidence has been found indicating a building program under the New Kingdom rulers Ramesses I, Seti I and Ramesses II.

A naos of Nectanebo II, a relic from an earlier building, is preserved in the inner sanctuary, which stands alone while the temple's barque sanctuary is surrounded by nine chapels.

Over the centuries, the temple became buried to a depth of 12 metres (39 ft) beneath drifting desert sand and layers of river silt deposited by the Nile. Local inhabitants built homes directly over the former temple grounds. Only the upper reaches of the temple pylons were visible by 1798, when the temple was identified by a French expedition. In 1860 Auguste Mariette, a French Egyptologist, began the work of freeing Edfu temple from the sands.

The Temple of Edfu is nearly intact and a good example of an ancient Egyptian temple. Its archaeological significance and high state of preservation have made it a center for tourism in Egypt and a frequent stop for the many riverboats that cruise the Nile. In 2005, access to the temple was revamped with the addition of a visitor center and paved carpark. A lighting system was added in late 2006 to allow night visits.

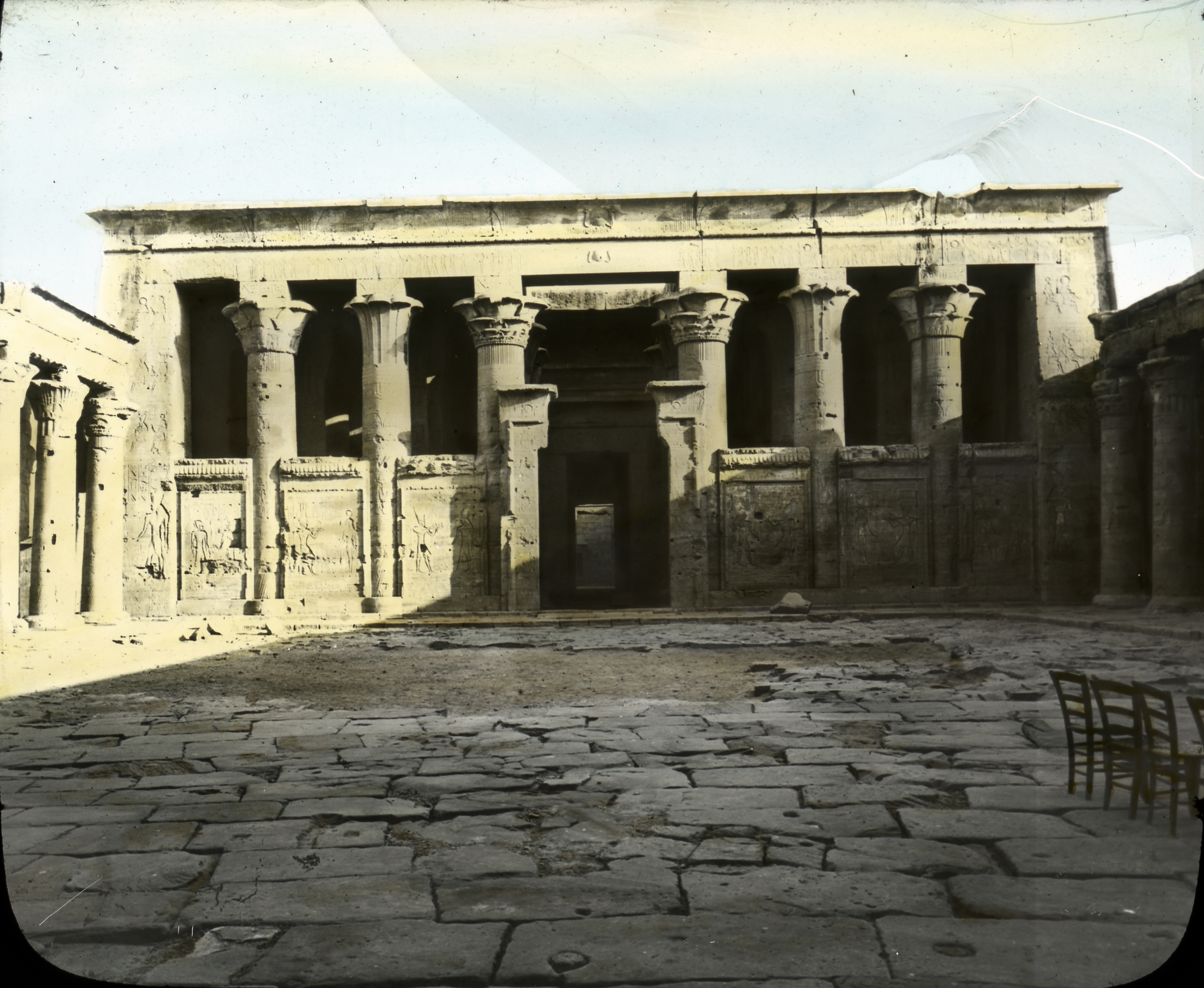
North side of court of Temple of Edfu

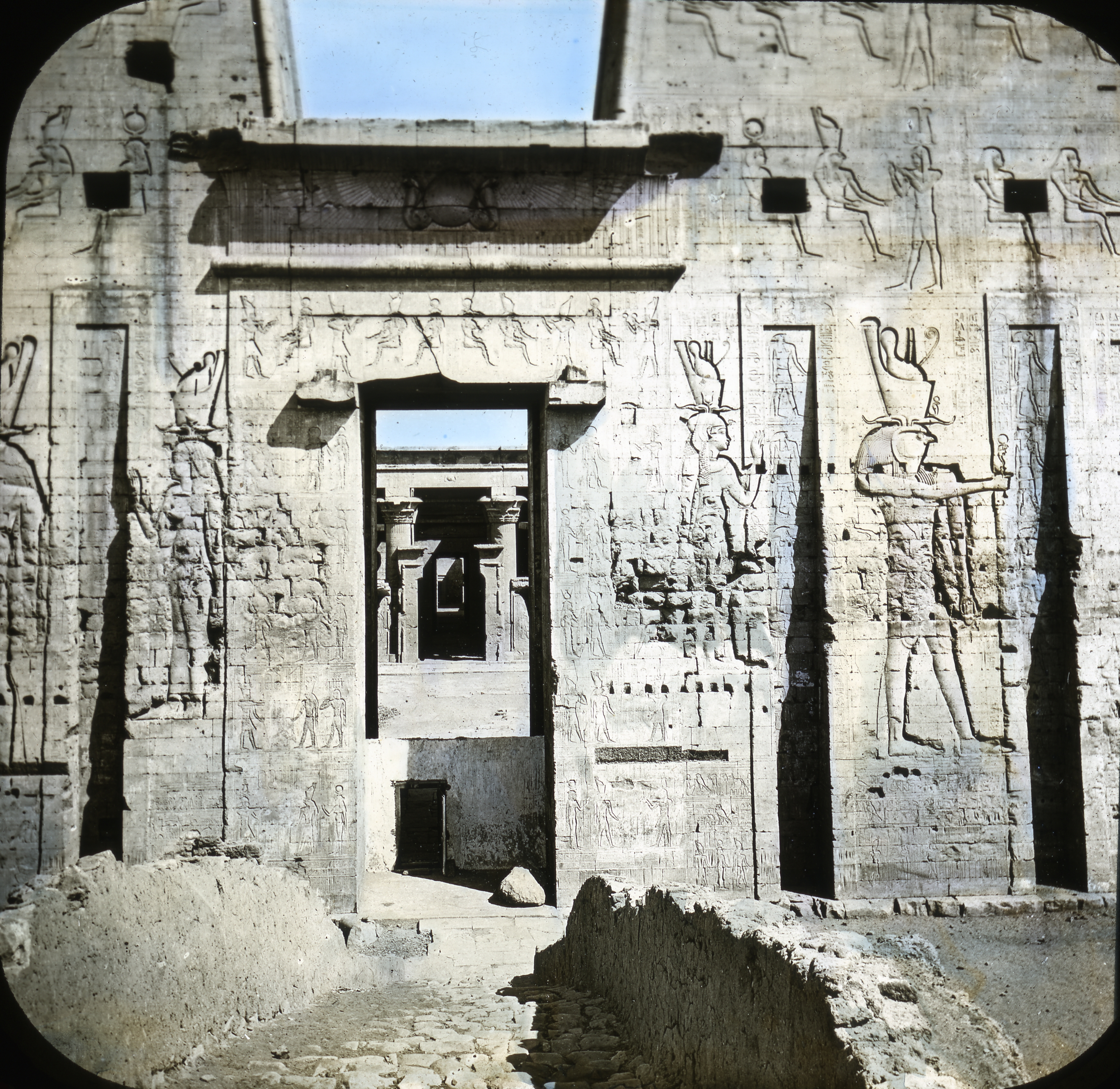
Door of the Pylon

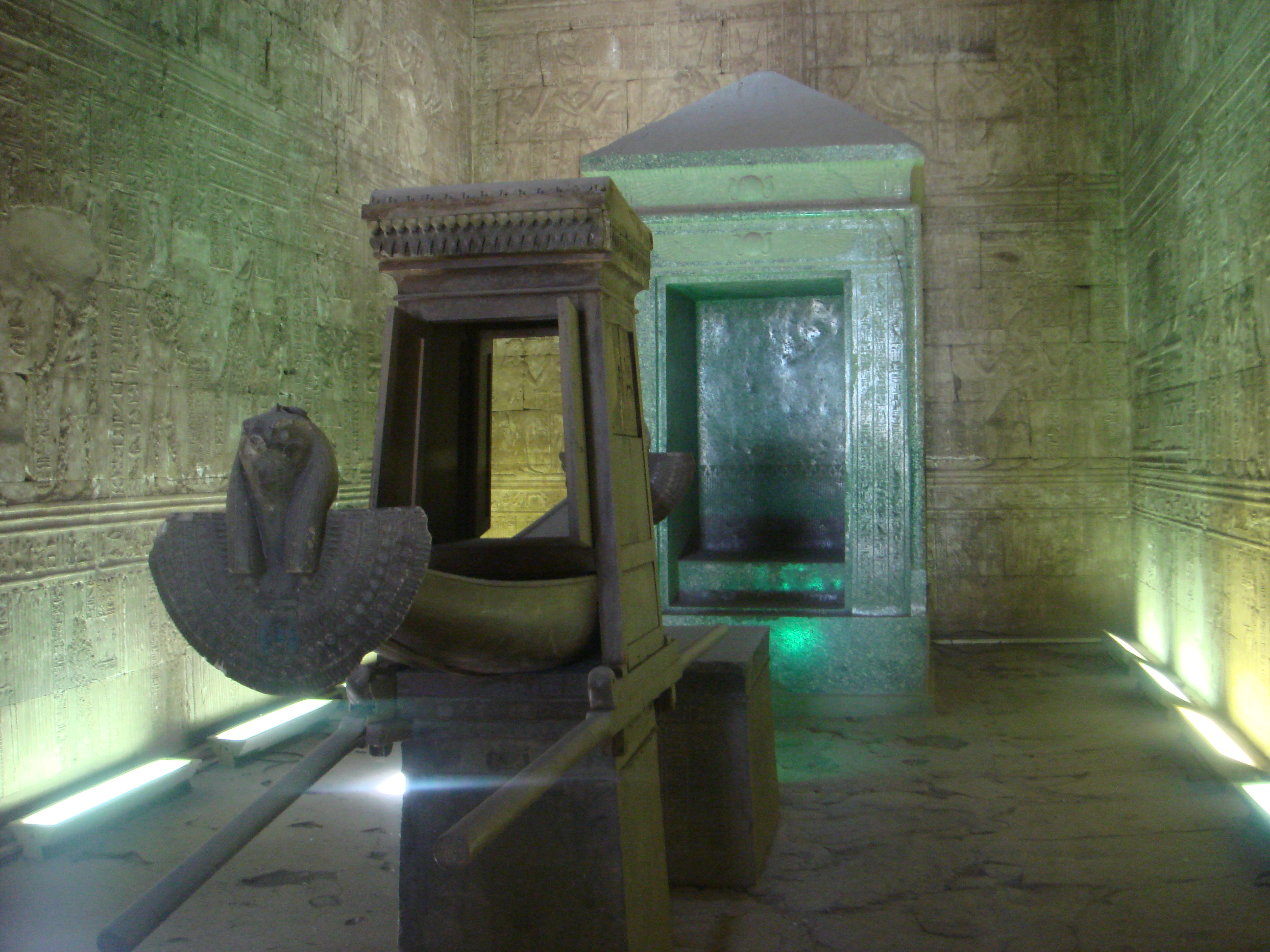
Inside the sanctuary at the centre of the temple.

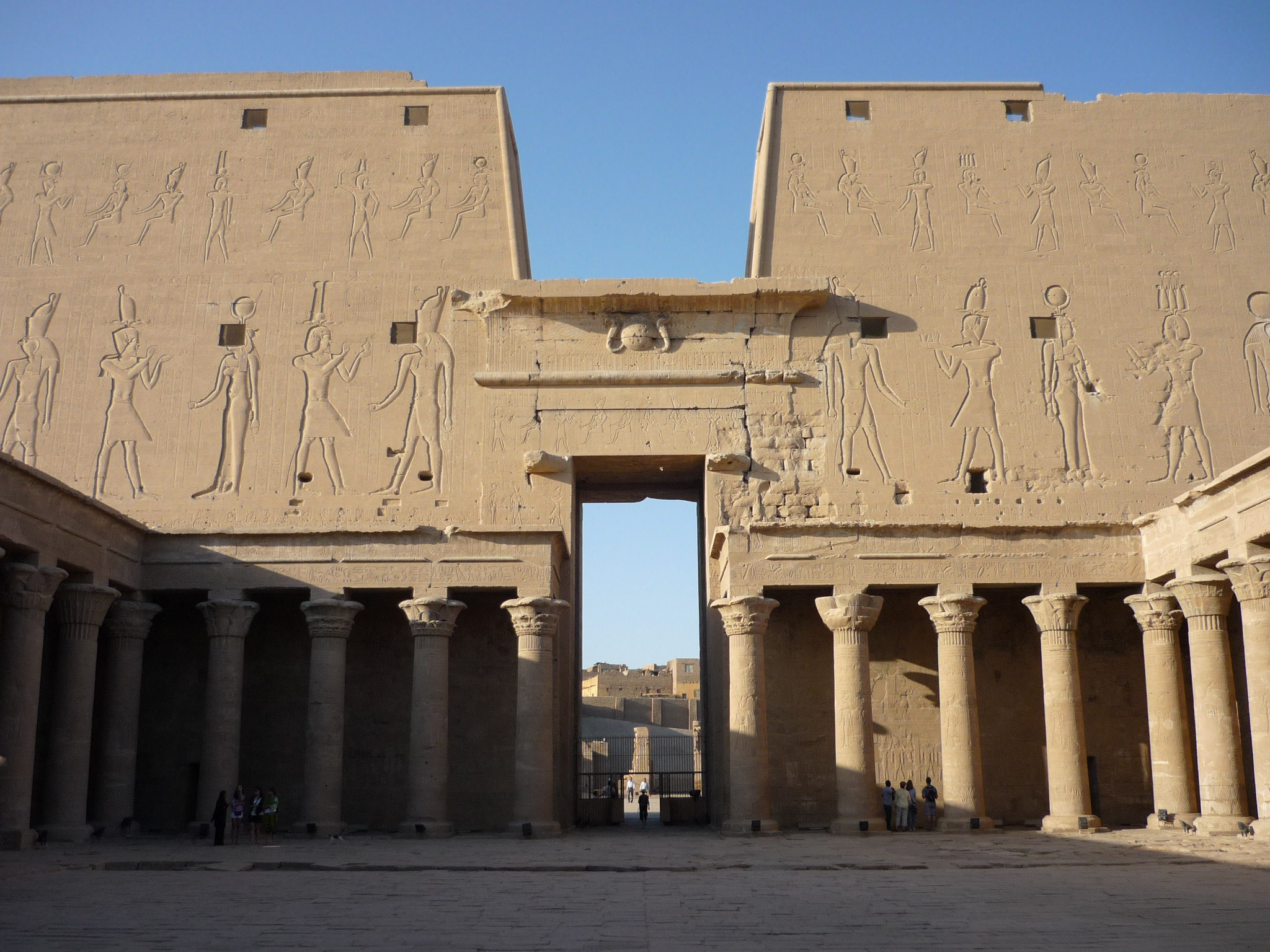
The forecourt of the temple, looking south-east

== Religious significance ==
The temple of Edfu is the largest temple dedicated to Horus and Hathor of Dendera. It was the center of several festivals sacred to Horus. Each year, "Hathor travelled south from her temple at Denderah to visit Horus at Edfu, and this event marking their sacred marriage was the occasion of a great festival and pilgrimage."

The temple contains a small chamber known as the laboratory, located on the western side of the inner hypostyle hall. Its walls preserve inscriptions describing ingredients and preparation methods for scented ointments and incense used in religious rituals.

== Creation myth of the temple ==
The creation myth of the temple of Edfu consists of several related scenes, which are found primarily on the inside of the perimeter walls of the temple.

They tell the story of the beginning of the world, when it was still entirely covered by water. During the struggle between land and primeval water, the land managed to come close to the surface. Where this happened, reeds grew with the help of a falcon, which were strengthened by the gods The Far and The Large. The reeds were the germ cell for the temple of Edfu, and here Horus landed, as a falcon. A force approached, in the form of a bird, and fed Horus, the lord of Edfu; This ritual was the beginning of the cult of Edfu.

The snakelike Apophis tried to impede the creation. Horus shuddered in fear, yet a harpoon, one of the forms of Ptah, came to the rescue. The enemy was defeated and the creation continued. A falcon formed the sky dome, its wings reaching from horizon to horizon, and the sun began its daily cycle. Then the first temple of Edfu was designed by the gods Thoth and Seshat, one responsible for wisdom, the other for scripture. The godly master-builder constructed the temple according to these plans, but initially not of stone, but of reed.

The foundation ritual of the temple consists of multiple elements: First, the ground-plan was laid out with the stretching-the-cord ritual. When the construction was completed, the king handed the temple over to a triad of gods. To protect the building against external threats, 60 gods formed a living wall around the temple.

== Influence on British architecture ==
The Temple of Edfu provides the model for the Temple Works in Holbeck, Leeds. The courtyard columns at Edfu are closely copied in the frontage of the Works.

== Gallery ==
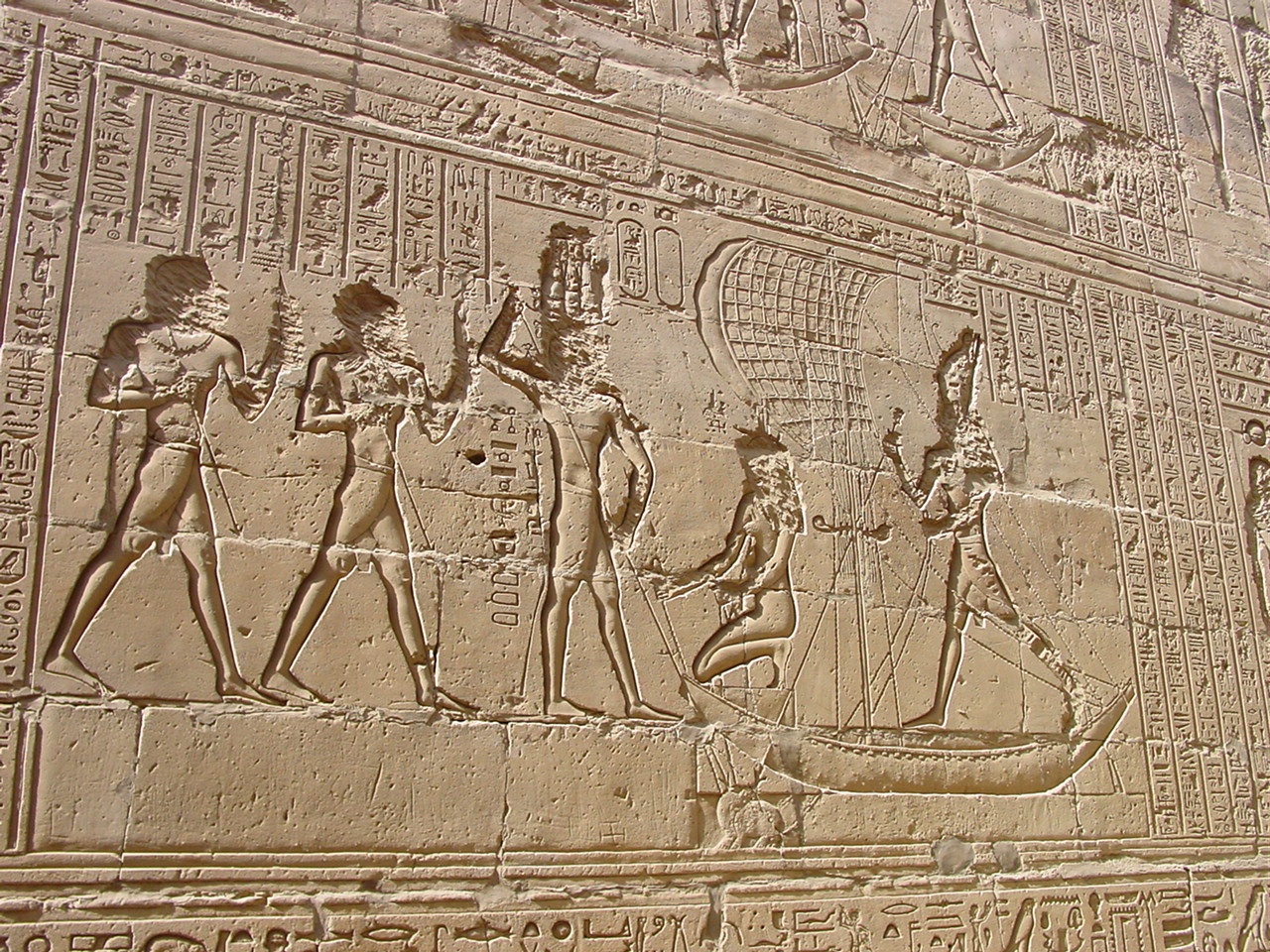
Reliefs on the walls of the Temple of Edfu

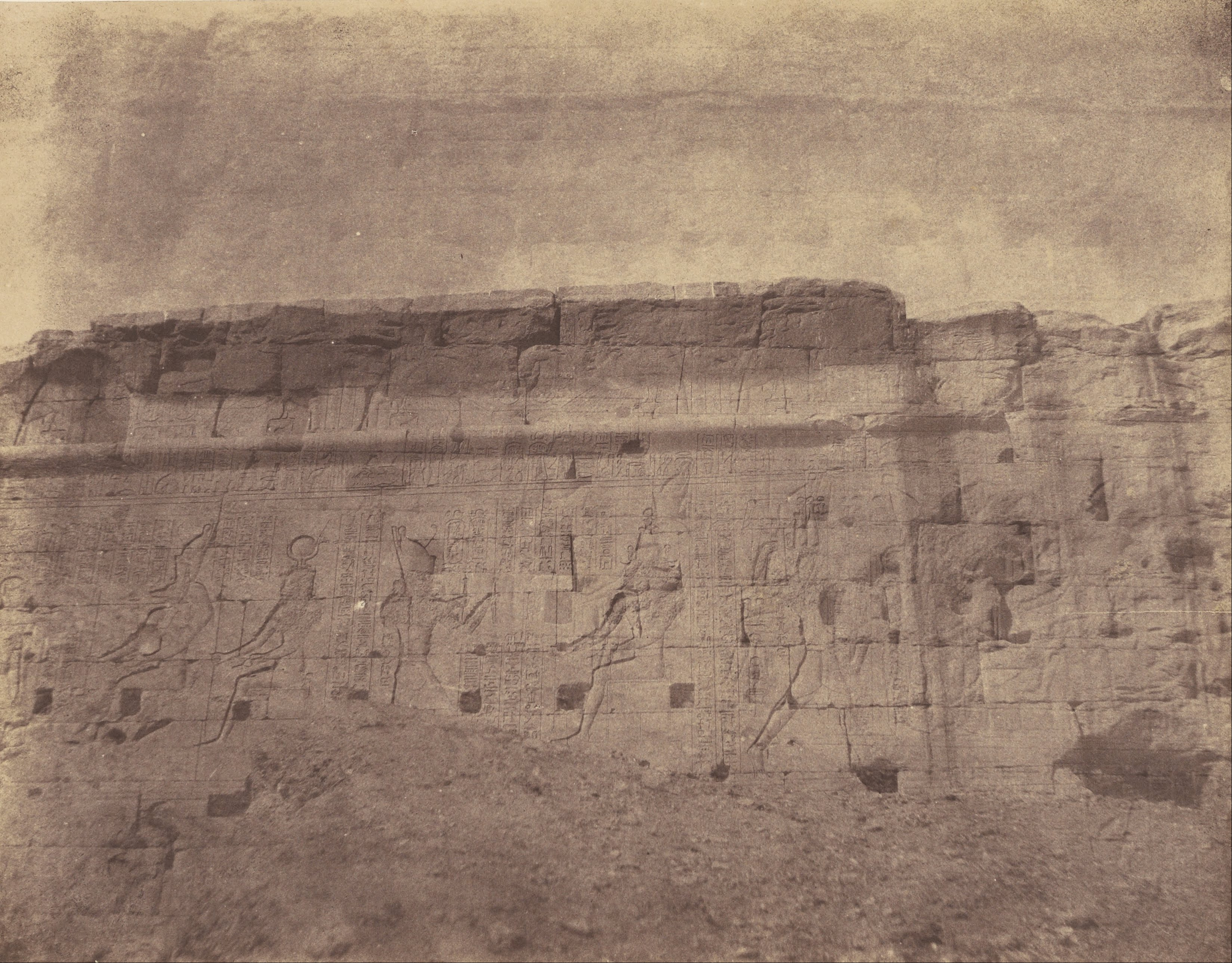
1854 photography by John Beasley Greene

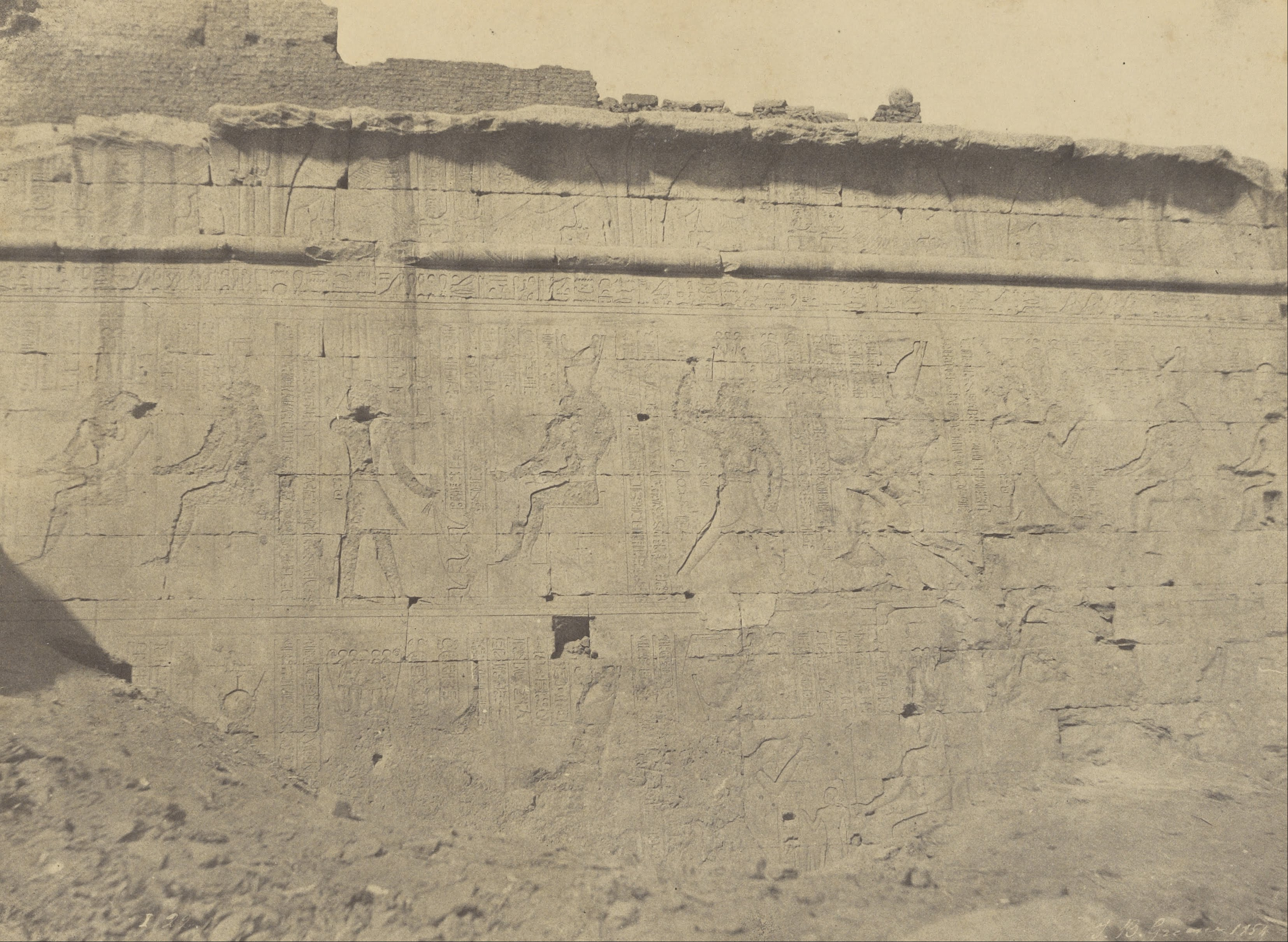
1854 photography by John Beasley Greene

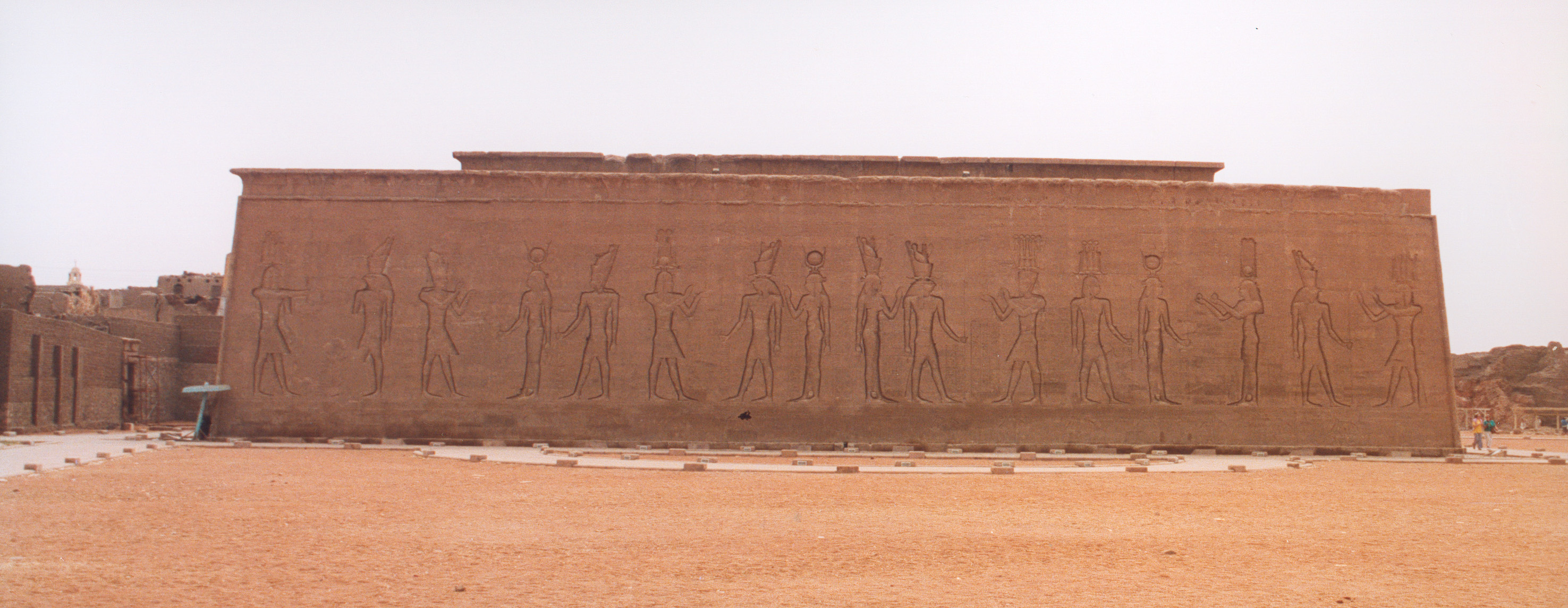
Rear

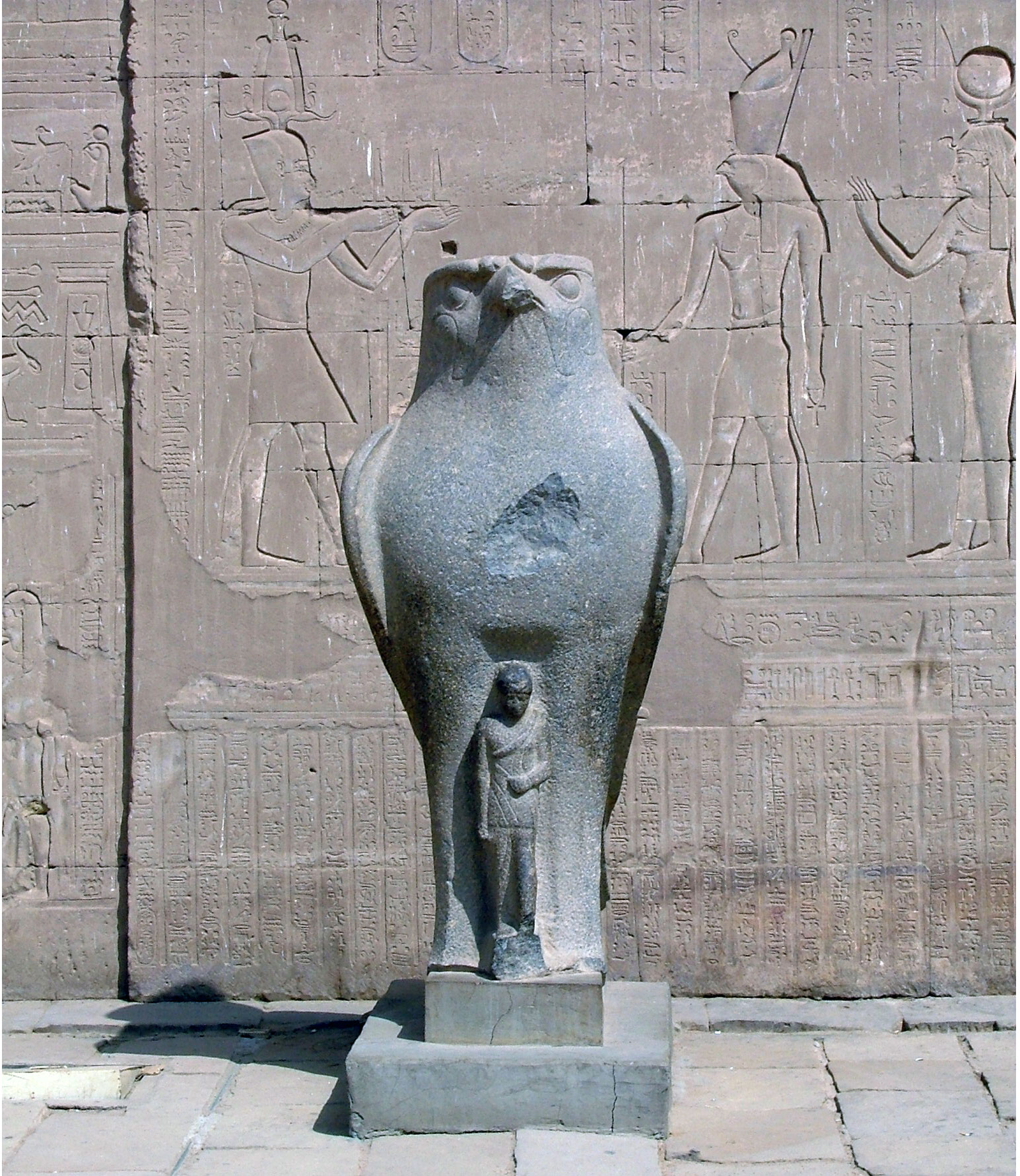
Horus

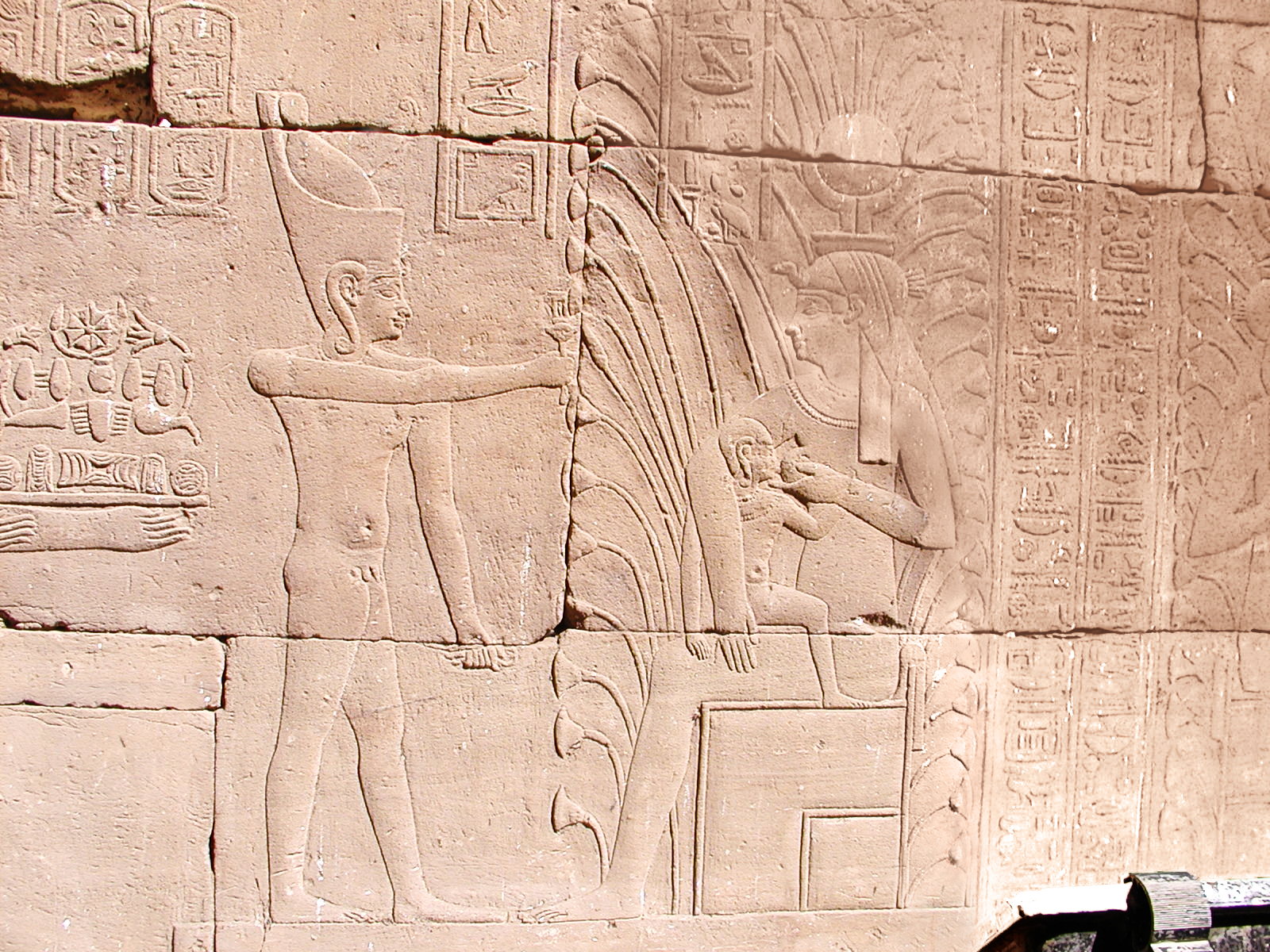
A breastfeeding scene in the interior walls

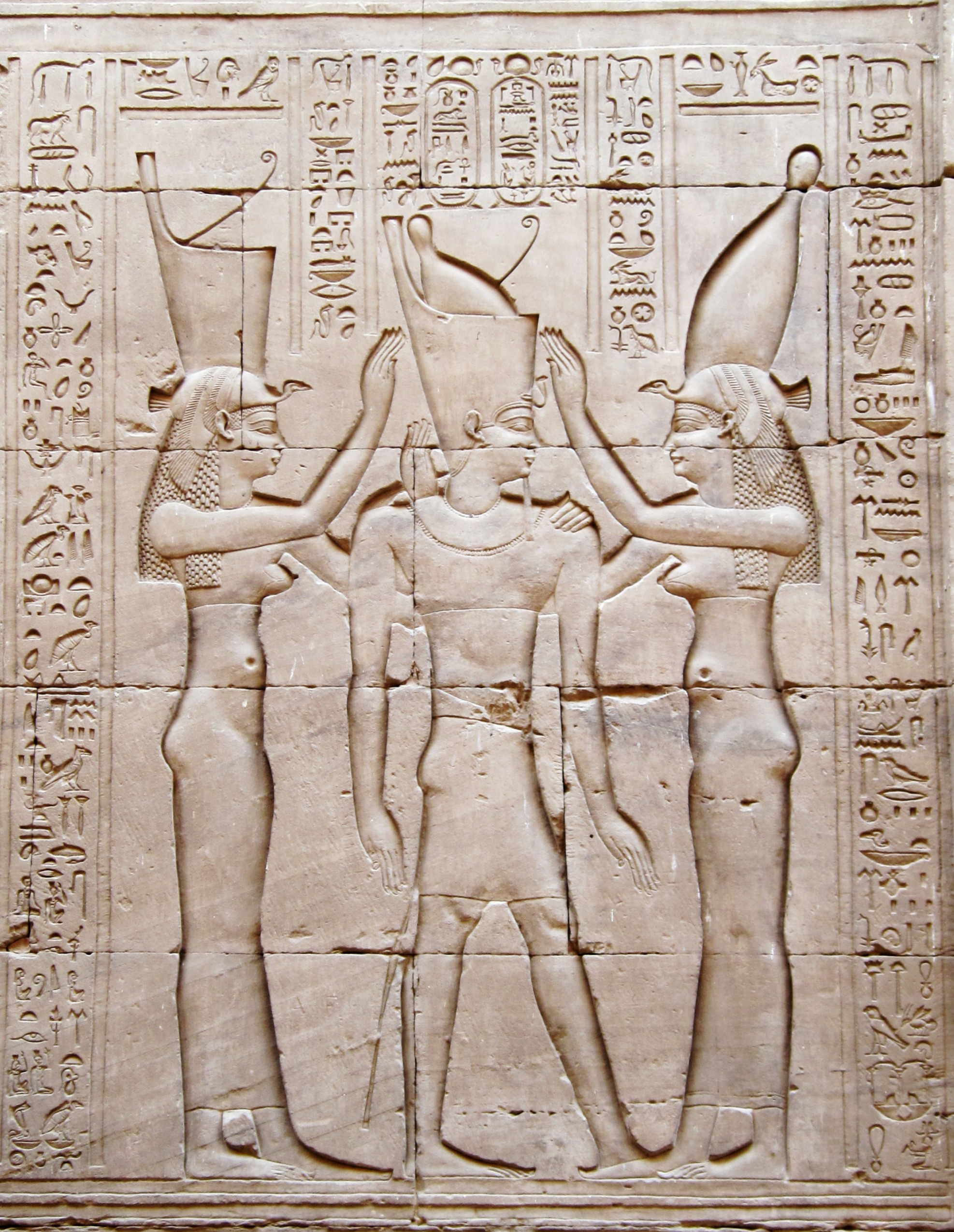
Wadjet and Nekhbet, the Two Ladies flank the pharaoh

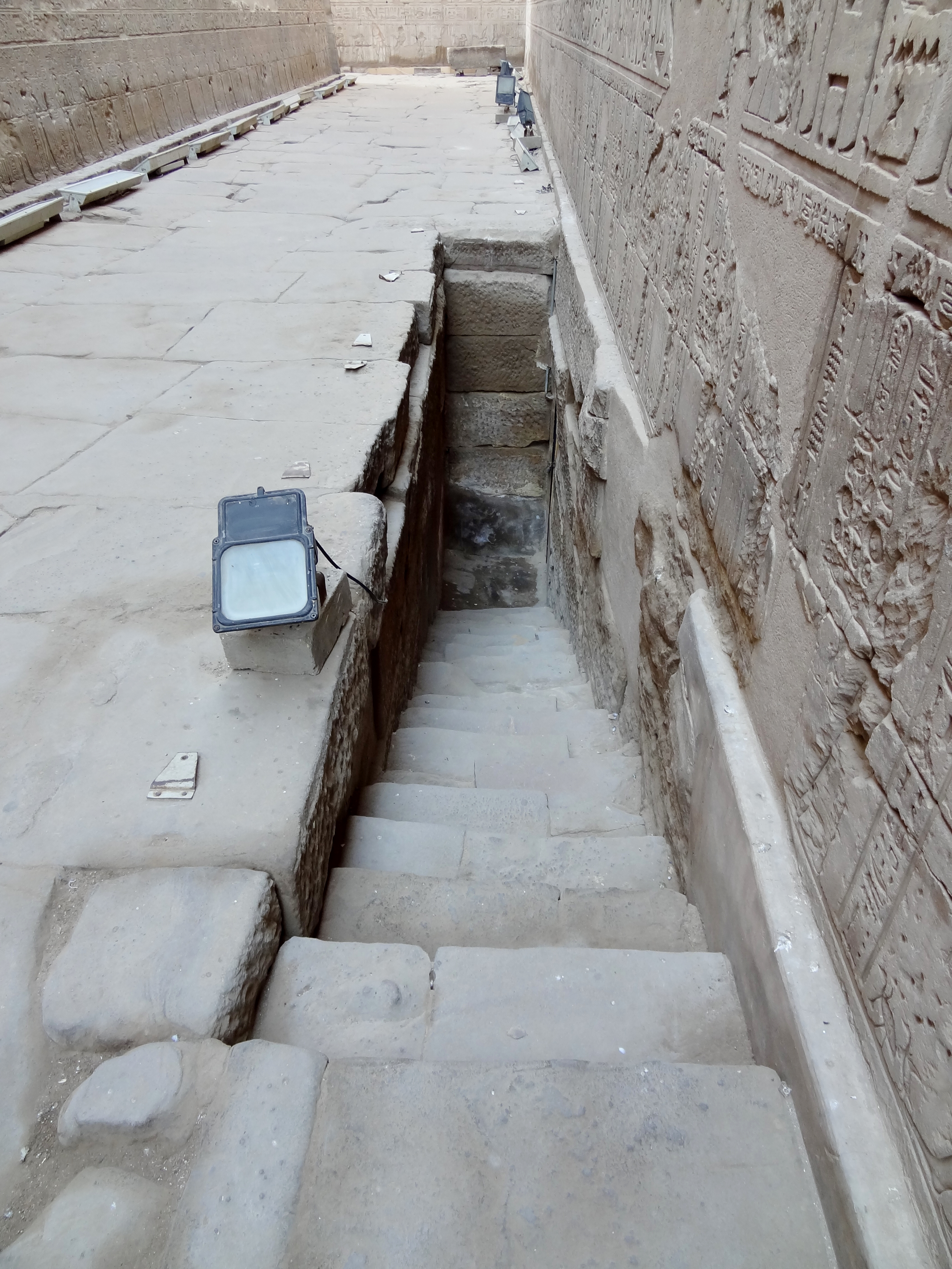
Nilometer for measuring the height of the Nile River

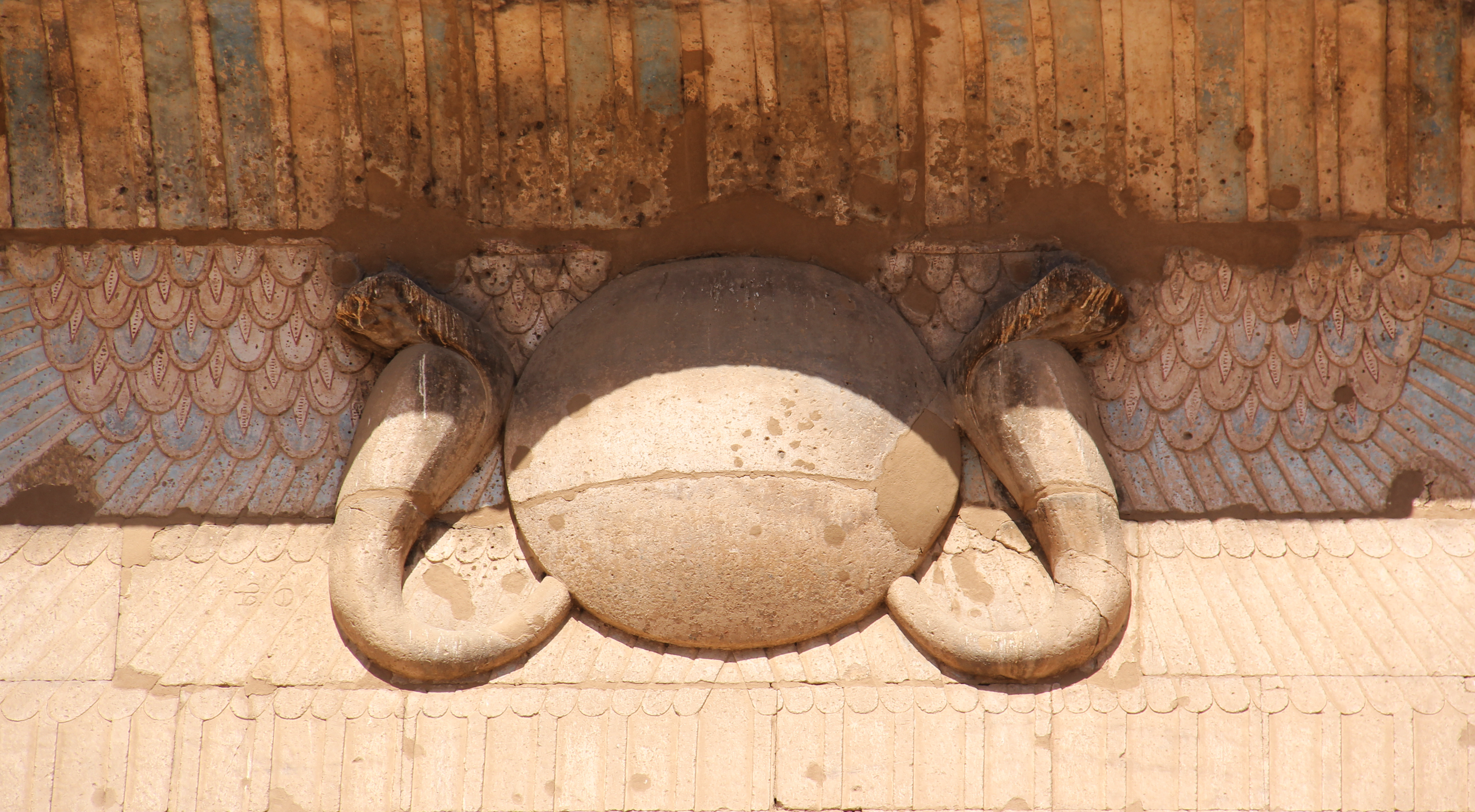
Relief

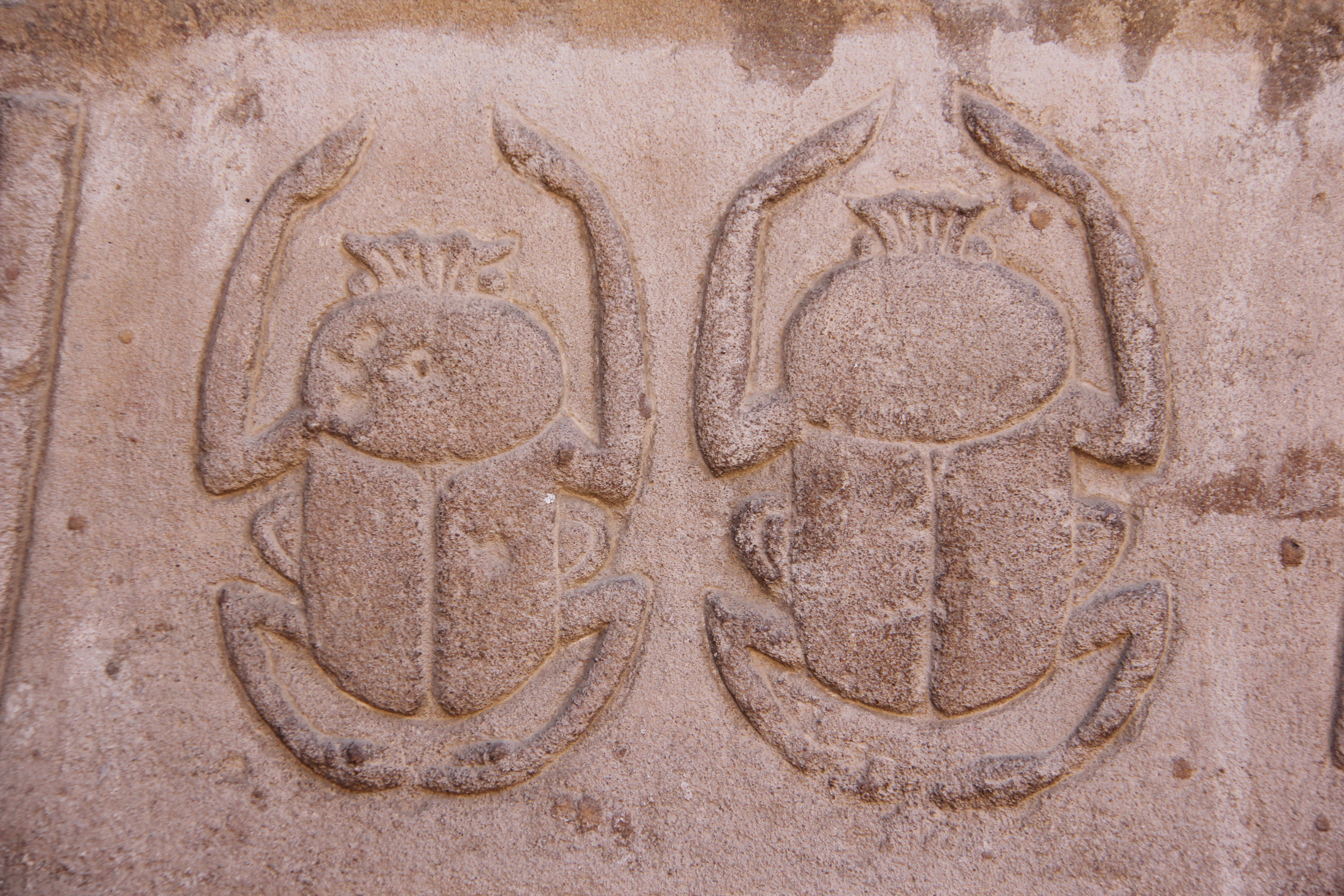
Relief

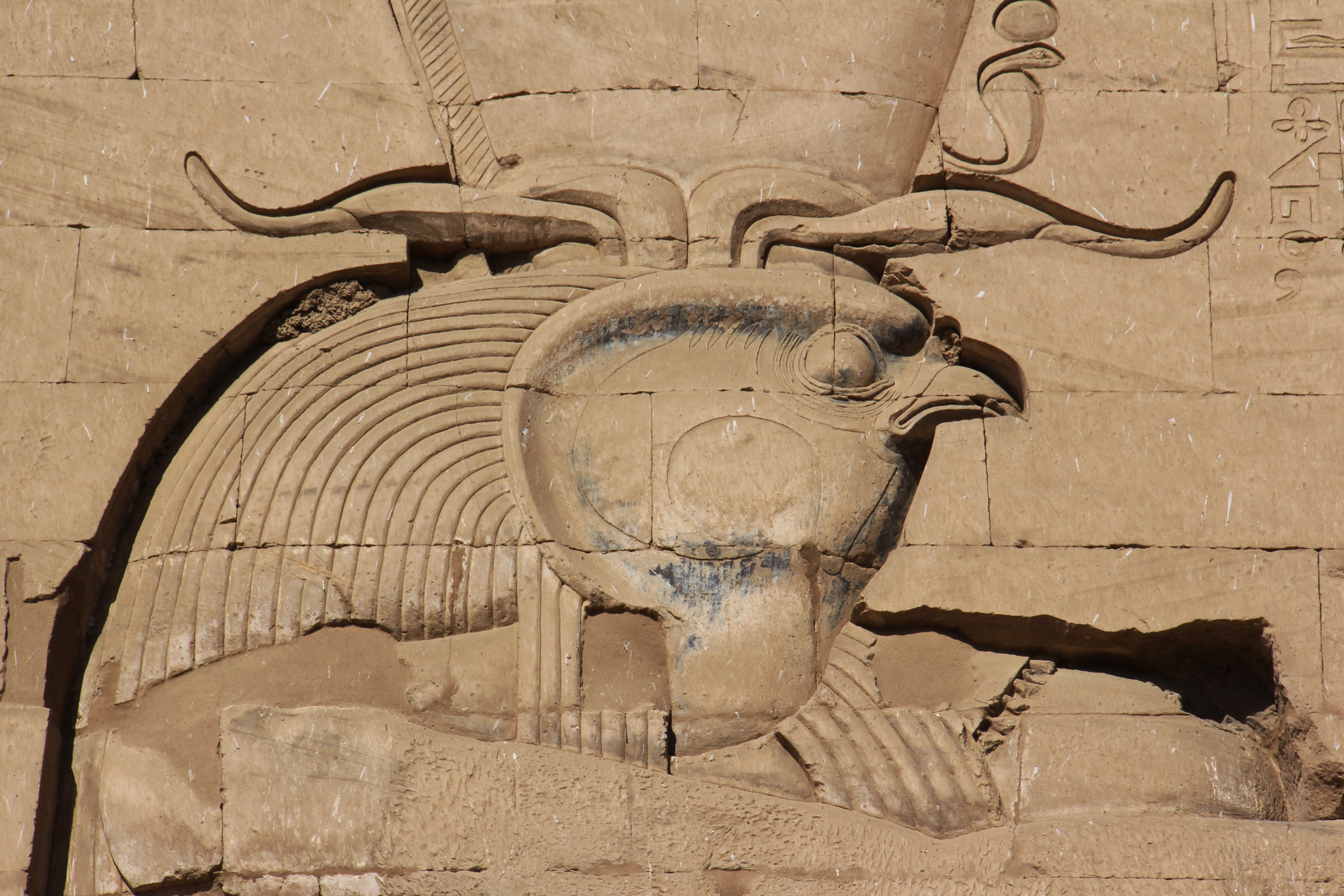
Relief

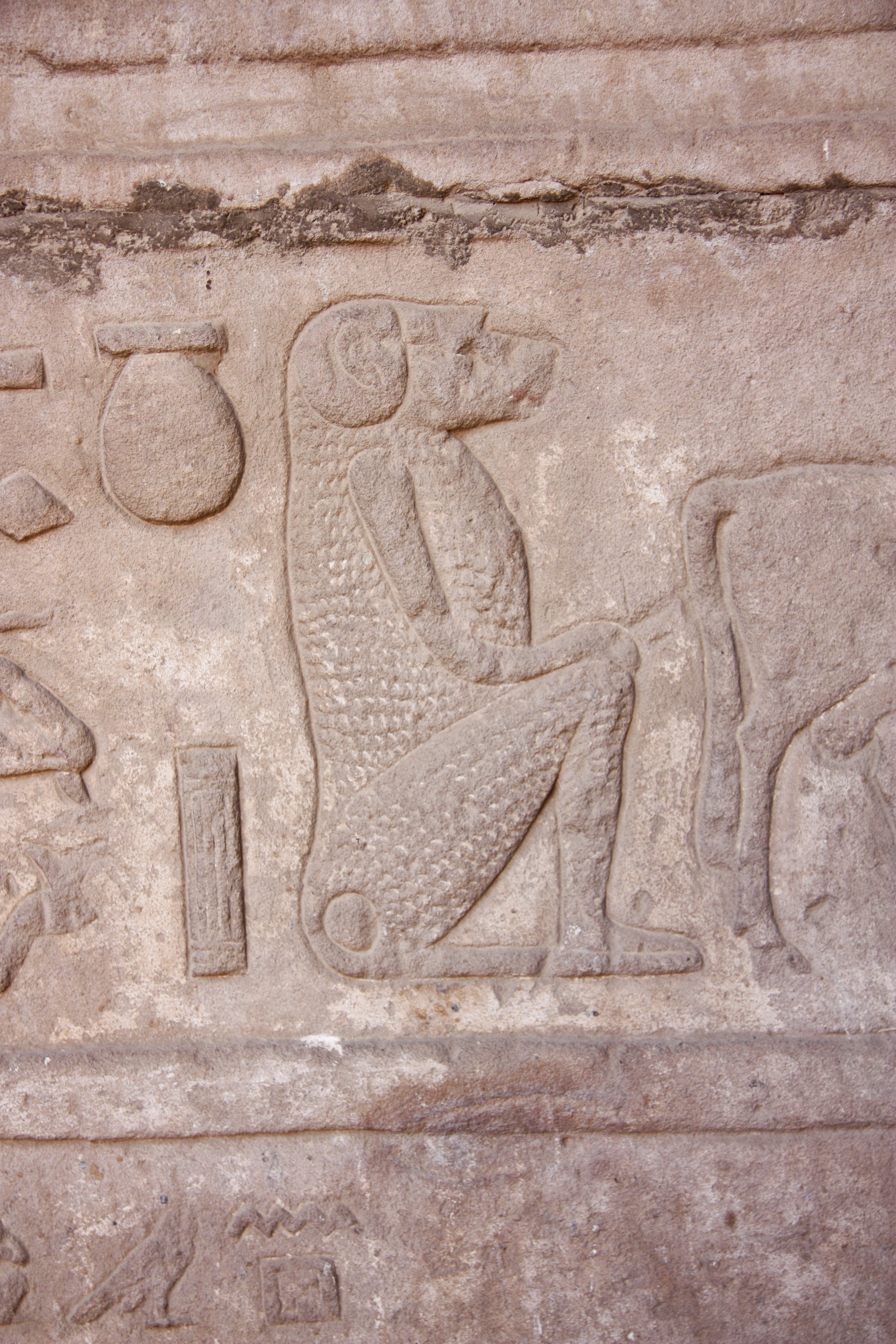
Detail

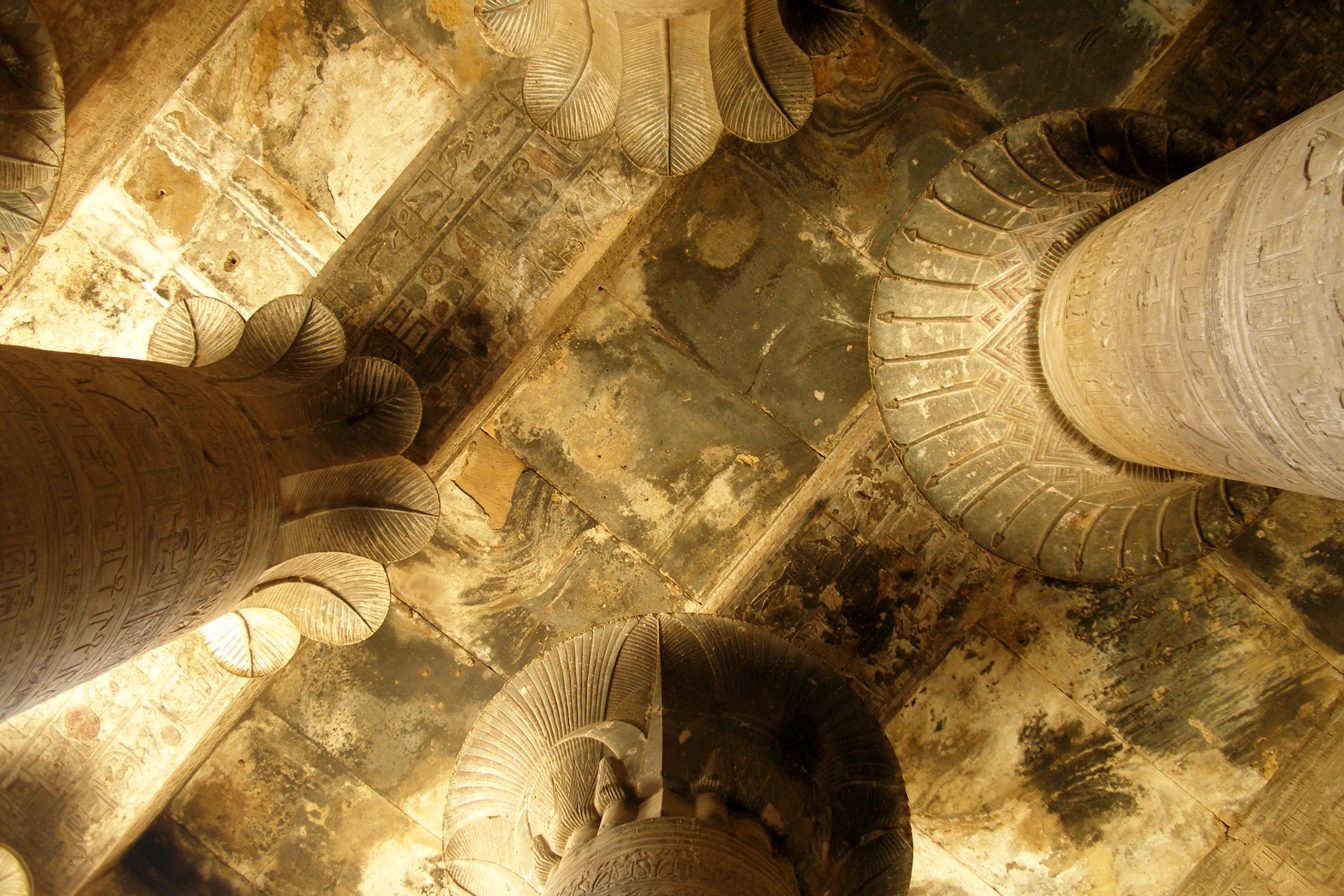
Ceiling

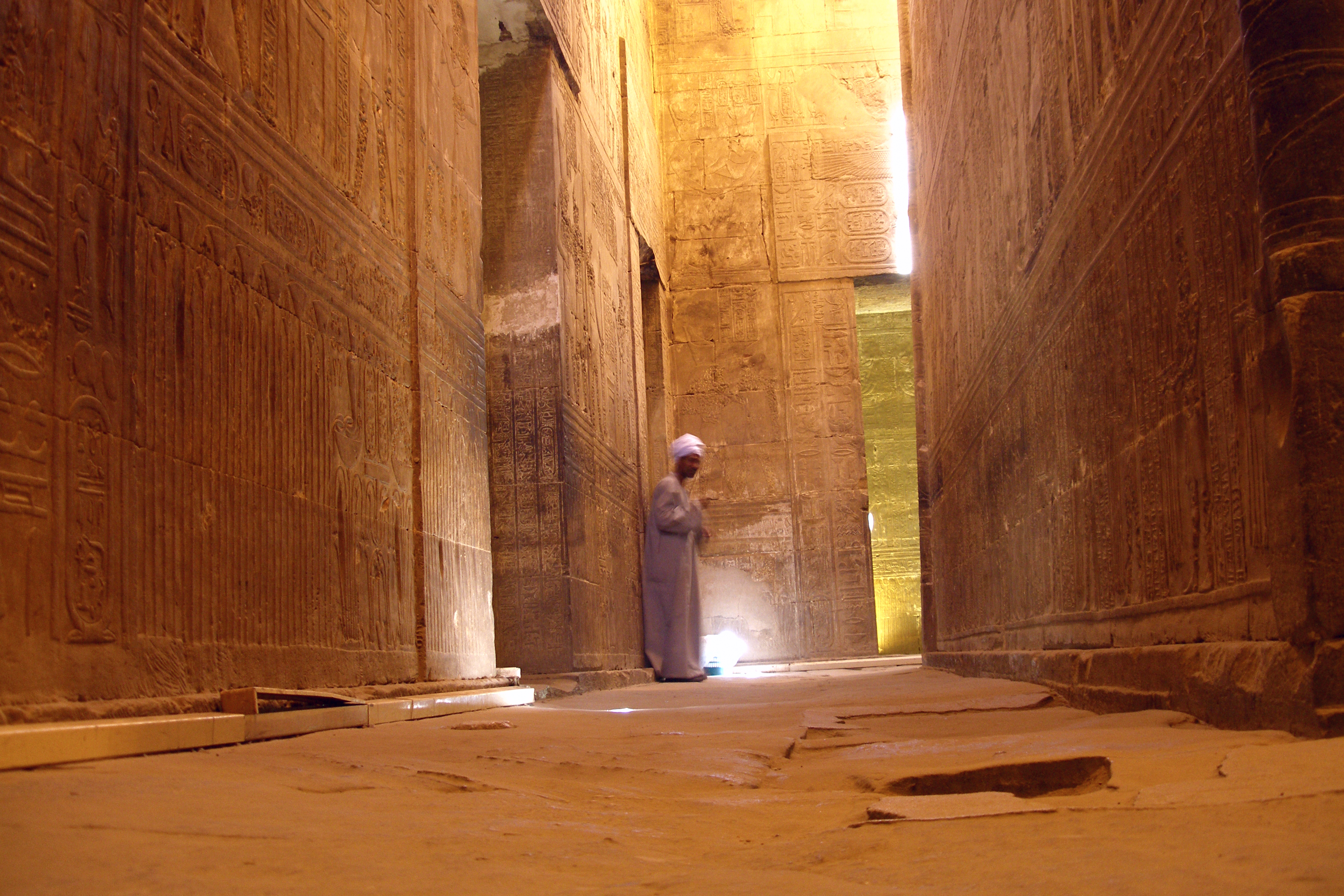
Corridor

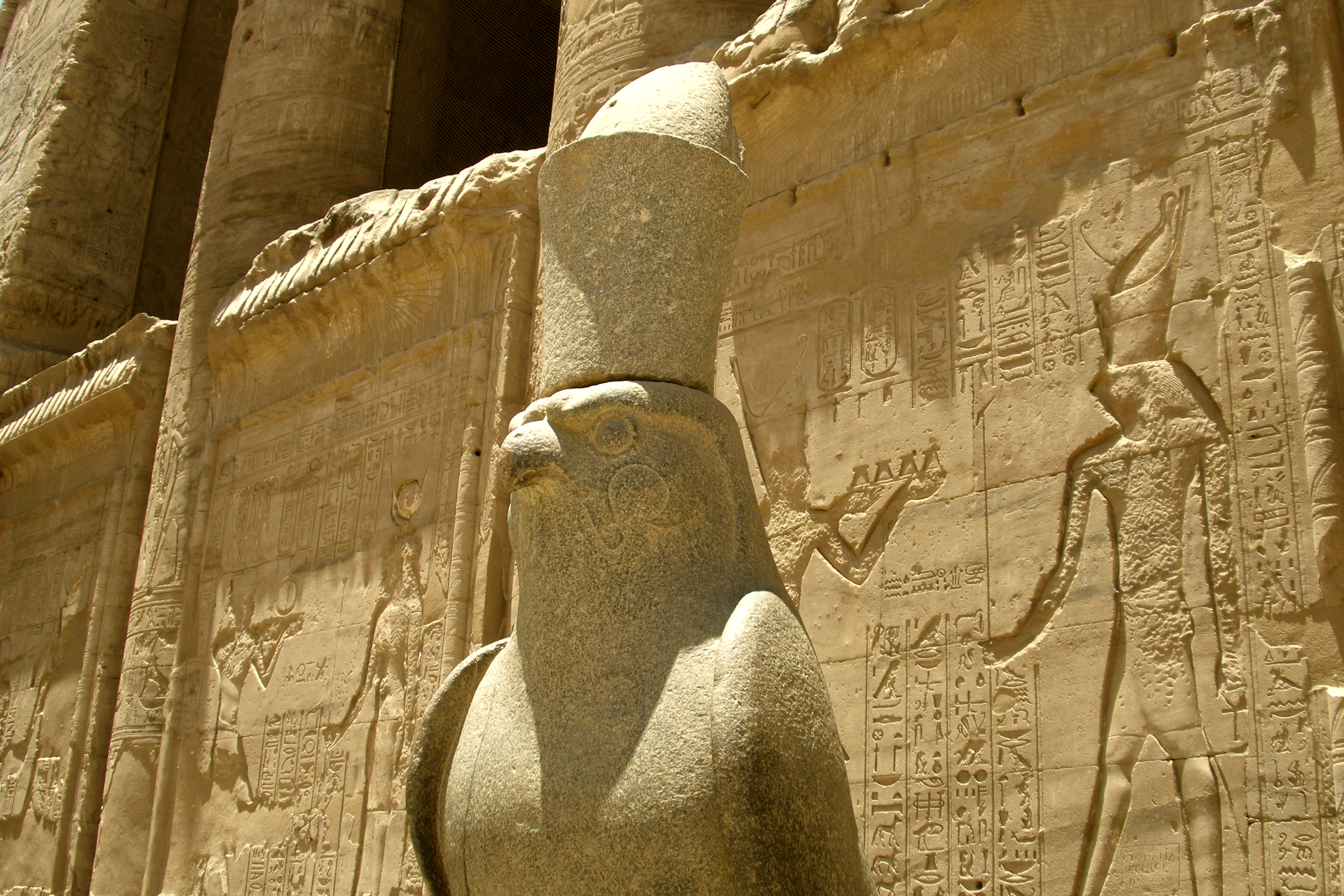
Statue of Horus in the courtyard of the temple

== See also ==
- List of ancient Egyptian sites, including sites of temples
- Ancient Egyptian architecture
- Edfu South Pyramid

== Notes ==
=== References ===
- Oakes, Lorna and Lucia Gahlin. Ancient Egypt: An illustrated reference to the myths, religions, pyramids and temples of the land of the pharaohs. 2006. ISBN 0-7607-4943-4
- Kurth, Dieter. The Temple of Edfu. 2004. American University in Cairo Press. ISBN 977 424 764 7
- Émile Gaston Chassinat, Maxence de Rochemonteix, Le temple d'Edfou, 14 vols. (1892–1934).
