= Wetjes-Hor =

Subnational administrative division of Ancient Egypt

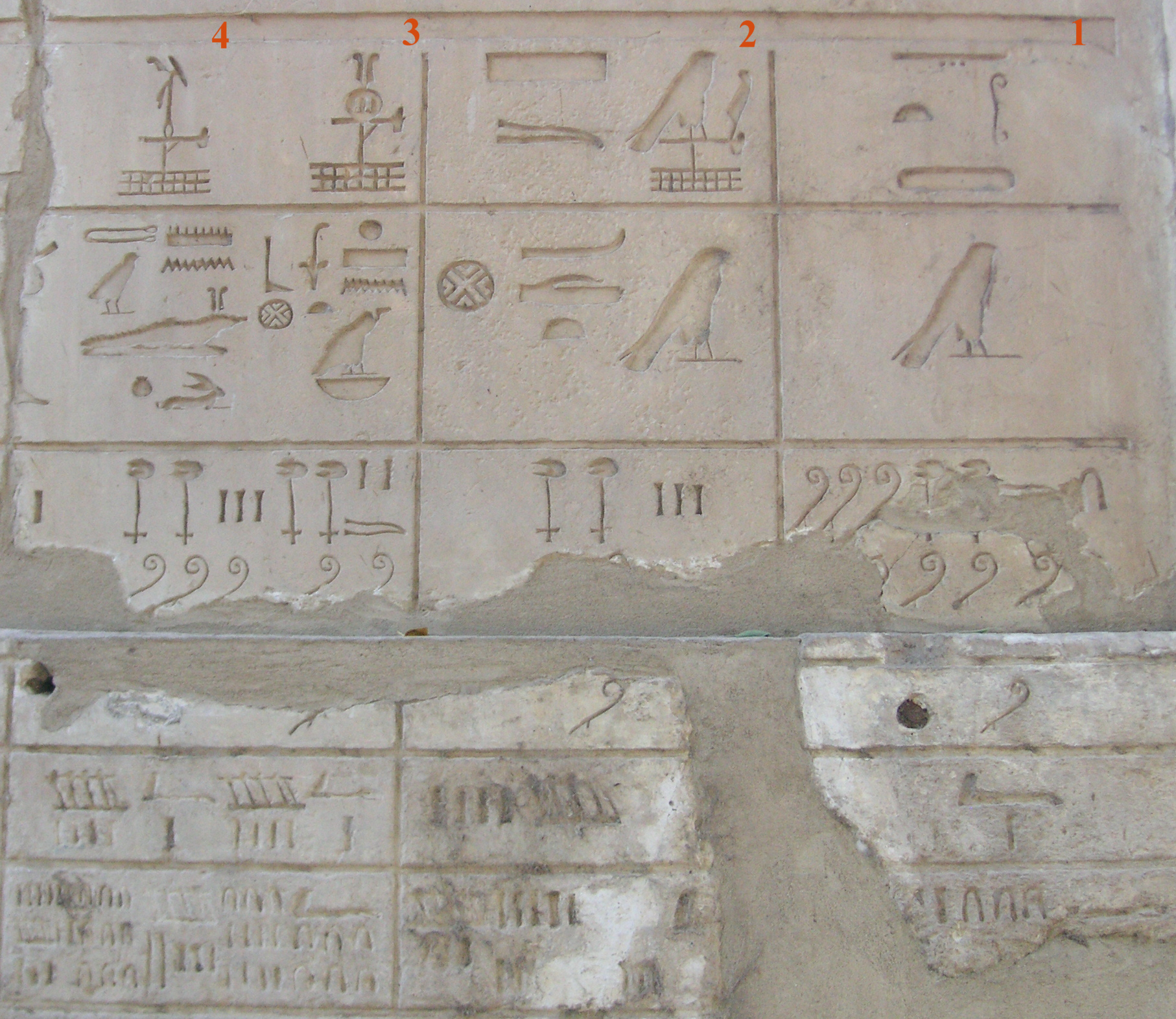
Wetjes-Hor (number 2) from the White Chapel of Senusret I at Karnak.

Wetjes-Hor was the second nome of Upper Egypt. Its major population center, modern Edfu, was called Behdet and Djeba in antiquity. Its Middle Kingdom cemetery is provides much information on the burial practices of commoners during this period. The Old Kingdom governor, Izi, whose mastaba is found in Edfu's necropolis, was worshiped as a minor deity in later times.

== Sources ==
- Grajetzki, Wolfram (2006). The Middle Kingdom of Ancient Egypt. Gerald Duckworth & Co. Ltd. ISBN 0-7156-3435-6. p. 87-88
