= Izi (nomarch) =

Nomarch

- Nomarch of the 2nd nome of Upper Egypt
- Tenure: c. 2400 BC
- Successor: Qar
- Dynasty: 6th Dynasty
- Pharaoh: Teti
- Burial: Tomb at Edfu
- Spouse: Zesheshet
- Children: Herui, Henut, Hewabenmaat, Idu, Qar and Shenu

Izi was a local governor of the Wetjes-Hor nome in the Ancient Egyptian Old Kingdom, around 2400 BC. He is mainly known from his mastaba at Edfu. In the late Middle Kingdom and Second Intermediate Period he was worshipped as local god.

In his mastaba, decorated blocks were found that provide a biography. According to the text, he started his career under Djedkare Isesi and was appointed to a higher position under king Unas. Further appointments came under the 6th Dynasty king Teti who made him to the local governor (great overlord of a province) in the Wejtes nome. Later, Izi was also involved in commissions at the royal court.

The inscription also provide names of family membersː His was wife was called Zesheshet. Several children are known, Herui, Henut, Hewabenmaat, Idu, Qar and Shenu. Qar became successor as local governor.

In the late Middle Kingdom Izi was worshipped as local saint. Many local people placed stela close to his mastaba. On those stelae he is often called the living god he is also called Vizier although there is no clear evidence, that he ever had that office in his lifetime.

== Bibliography ==
- Alliot, Maurice (1935): Rapport sur les fouilles de Tell Edfou (1933), Institut français d'archéologie orientale, Cairo, pp. 22-28 (the original hieroglyphic inscriptions) online
