= Edfu-Project =

Archaeological project

Coordinates: 24°58′42″N 32°52′25″E

The Edfu-Project is being undertaken with the primary goal of translating inscriptions of an ancient temple of Edfu in Egypt.

== History ==
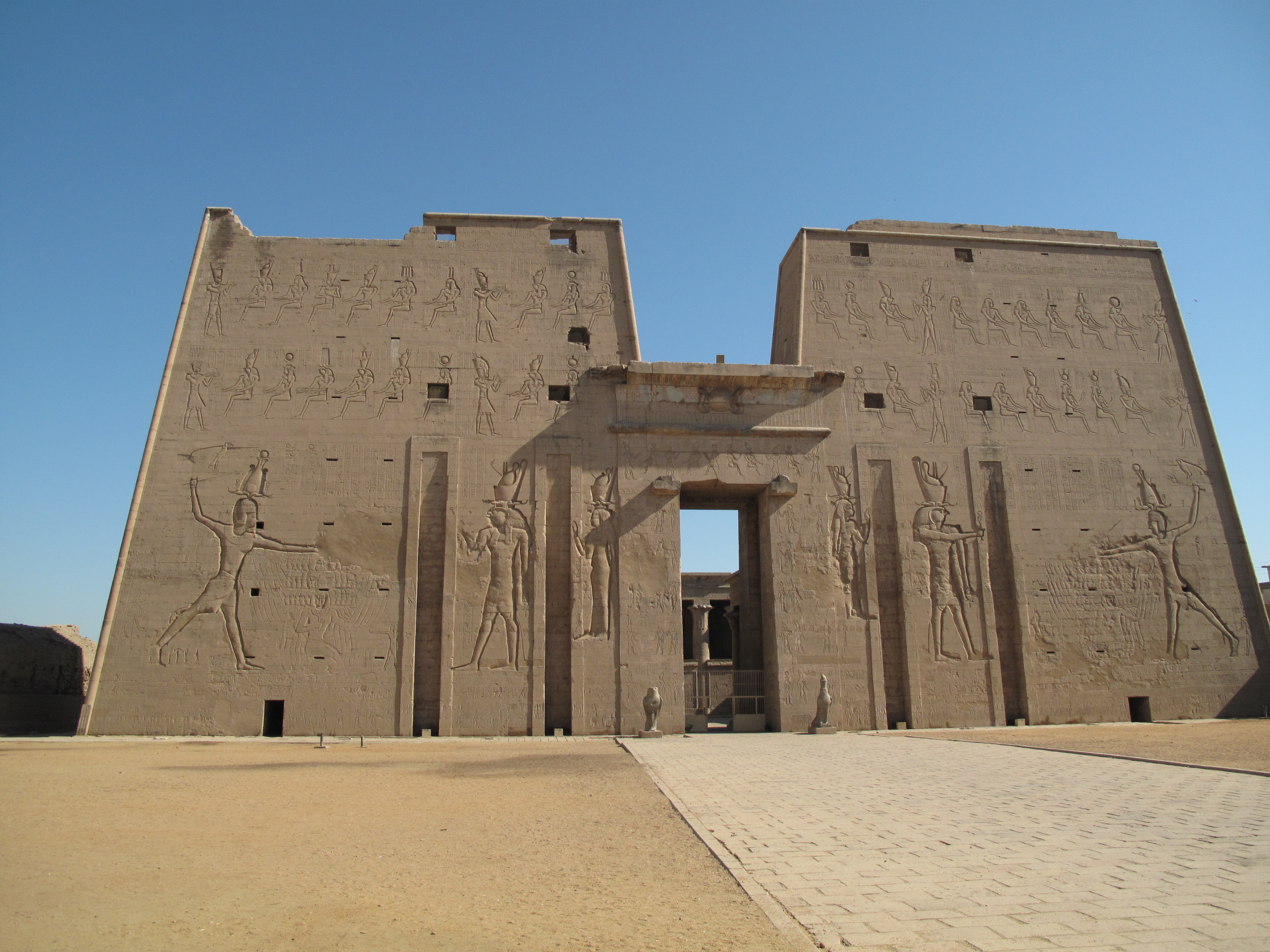
The main entrance of Edfu Temple showing the first pylon

In 1986, Professor Dr. Dieter Kurth of Hamburg University initiated a long-term project devoted to making a complete translation of the hieroglyphic inscriptions of the Temple of Edfu in Upper Egypt (Temple of Horus) that would meet the requirements of both linguistics and literary studies. The research comprised all internal parallels, relevant literature and an analysis of the systematics behind the decoration. Comprehensive analytical indices, useful for researchers of related disciplines, and a grammar of Graeco-Roman temple inscriptions were also compiled. The Edfu-Project, situated at the University of Hamburg, was financed until 2001 by the "German Research Foundation".

Since 2002, the Academy of Sciences of Göttingen has been in charge of the Edfu project, which is now financed by the "Academies' Programme". The research unit continues to work at Hamburg University. A translation of the inscriptions of the pylon (gate), including transcriptions and a commentary, was published in 1998 (Edfou VIII). This was followed in 2004 by a translation of the inscriptions of the outer girdle wall (Edfou VII) some of which had not previously been published. The most recent publication, released in 2014, provided a translation of the inscriptions of the inner side of the girdle wall (Edfou VI). Inscriptions of the open court and its columns (Chassinat, Edfou V-VI) are available in preliminary translation.

== Literature ==
- D. Kurth unter Mitarbeit von A. Behrmann, D. Budde, A. Effland, H. Felber, E. Pardey, S. Rüter, W. Waitkus, S. Woodhouse: Die Inschriften des Tempels von Edfu. Abteilung I Übersetzungen; Band 1. Edfou VIII, Harrassowitz Wiesbaden 1998

This volume contains the translation of the texts on the temple's pylon.

- D. Kurth unter Mitarbeit von A. Behrmann, D. Budde, A. Effland, H. Felber, J.-P. Graeff, S. Koepke, S. Martinssen-von Falck, e. Pardey, S. Rüter und W. Waitkus: Die Inschriften des Tempels von Edfu. Abteilung I Übersetzung; Band 2. Edfou VII, Harrassowitz Wiesbaden 2004

This volume contains the translation of the outer side of the girdle wall.

- D. Kurth unter Mitarbeit von A. Behrmann, A. Block, R. Brech, D. Budde, A. Effland, M. von Falck, H. Felber, J.-P. Graeff, S. Koepke, S. Martinssen-von Falck, E. Pardey, S. Rüter, W. Waitkus und S. Woodhouse: Die Inschriften des Tempels von Edfu. Abteilung I Übersetzungen; Band 3. Edfou VI, PeWe Verlag Gladbeck 2014

This volume contains the translation of the inner side of the girdle wall.

- Dieter Kurth (Hrsg.): Die Inschriften des Tempels von Edfu. Begleithefte. Harrassowitz, Wiesbaden 1991 ff. ISSN 0937-8413
- Dieter Kurth, Edfu. Ein ägyptischer Tempel, gesehen mit den Augen der Alten Ägypter, Wissenschaftliche Buchgesellschaft, Darmstadt 1994
- Dieter Kurth, Treffpunkt der Götter. Inschriften aus dem Tempel des Horus von Edfu, Artemis & Winkler Verlag, Zürich und München 1994; Düsseldorf und Zürich 1998
- Dieter Kurth, The Temple of Edfu. A Guide by an Ancient Egyptian Priest, AUC-Press, Kairo 2004
