= Edfu =

Edfu إدفو ⲉⲧⲃⲟ
- City
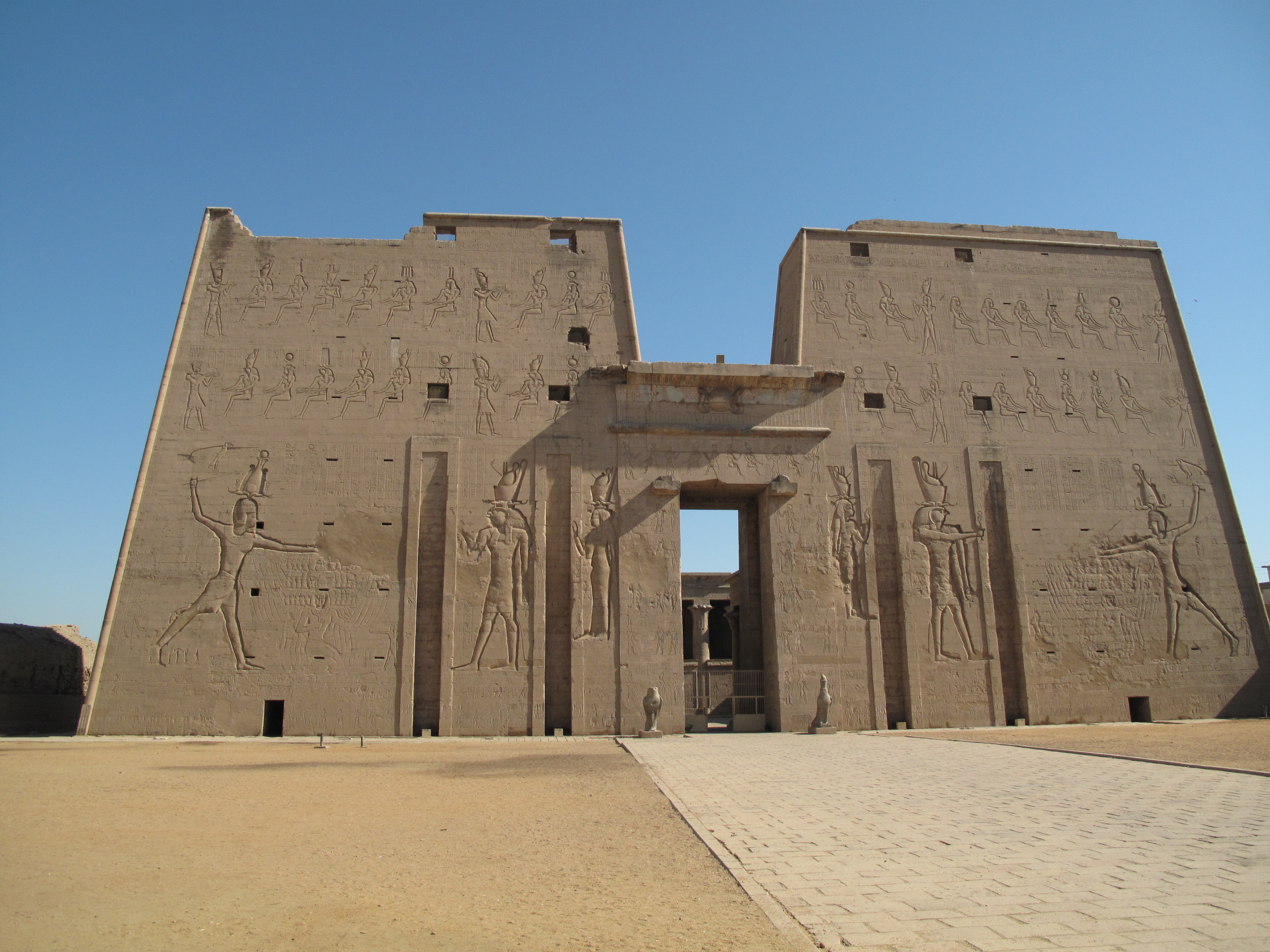
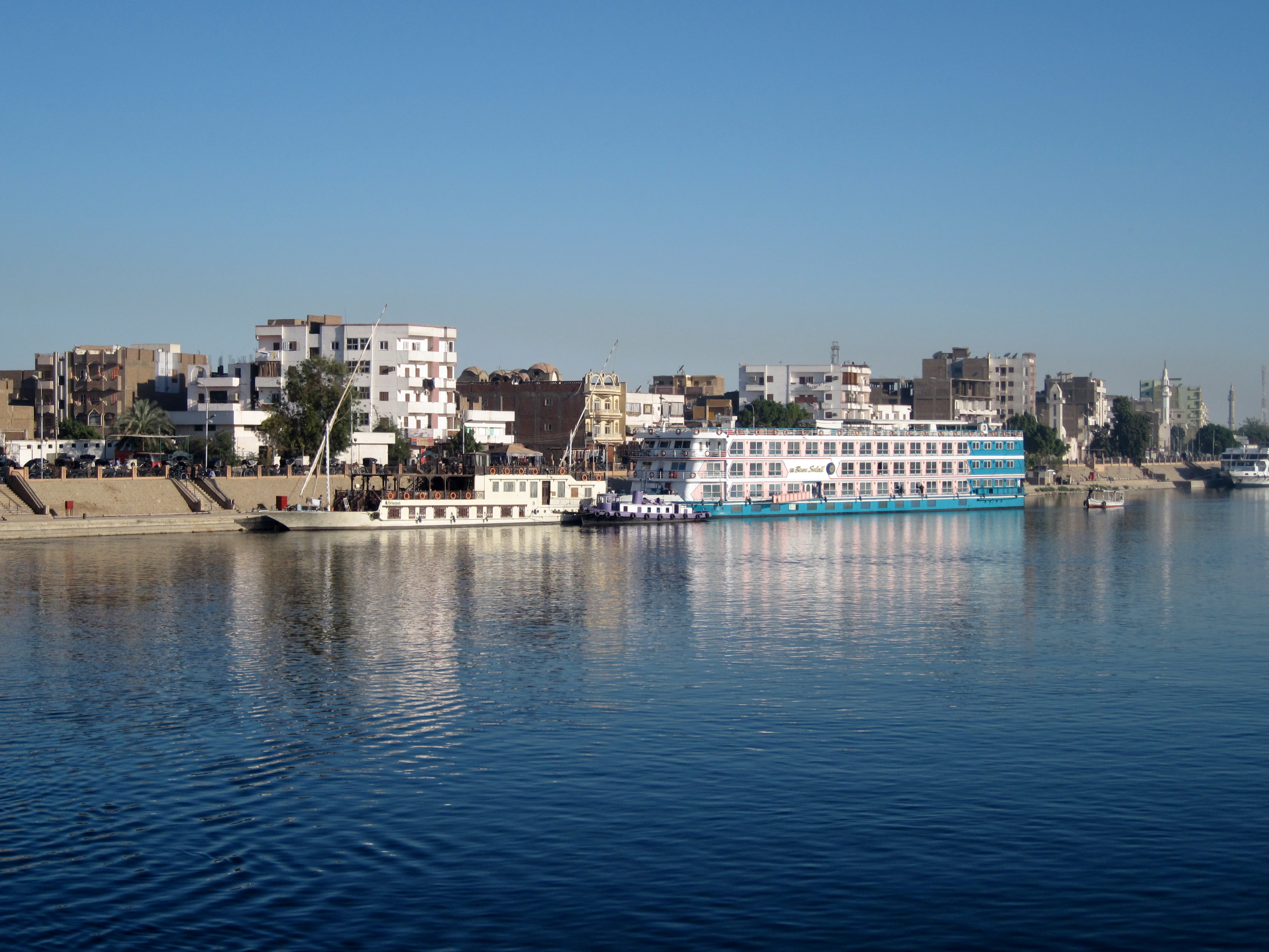
- Clockwise from top left: Front of Temple of Edfu, streetview, Nile River, and Edfu Public Hospital.

- Location in Egypt
- Coordinates: 24°58′40″N 32°52′24″E
- Country: Egypt
- Governorate: Aswan Governorate

Area
  - City: 2,304 km^{2} (890 sq mi)
- Elevation: 86 m (282 ft)

Population (2023)
  - City: 60,000
  - Density: 26/km^{2} (67/sq mi)
  - Urban: 502,994
- Time zone: UTC+2 (EET)
  - Summer (DST): UTC+3 (EEST)
- Area code: (+20) 97

Edfu (Ancient Egyptian: bḥdt, Arabic: إدفو pronounced [ˈʔedfu], Sahidic Coptic: ⲧⲃⲱ, ⲧⲃⲟ, Bohairic Coptic: ⲑⲃⲱ, ⲁⲧⲃⲱ; also spelt Idfu, or in modern French as Edfou) is a city in Upper Egypt, located on the west bank of the Nile River between Esna and Aswan, with a population of approximately 60,000 people. Edfu is the site of the Ptolemaic Temple of Horus and the ancient settlement of Tell Edfu. About 5 km (3.1 mi) south of Edfu are remains of ancient pyramids.

== Ancient history ==
=== Ancient Tell Edfu ===
bH d t niwt
bḥdt
in hieroglyphs

The remains of the ancient settlement of Edfu are situated about 50 m to the west of the Ptolemaic temple – to the left of the older temple pylon. This settlement is known as Wetjeset-hor and the Greek name was Apollinopolis Magna (Ancient Greek: Apollinòpolis, Απολλινόπολις). According to Notitia Dignitatum, part of Legio II Traiana Fortis was camped in Apollo superior, which was the Roman name for the town.

Although unassuming and unglamorous to the visiting tourists, Tell Edfu is a monument that contains evidence of more Egyptian history and is of more archaeological interest than the Ptolemaic temple. Although major parts of the settlement show severe signs of erosion, cut away or have been exposed during sebakh-digging, enough is preserved to gain information from as far back as the Predynastic Period. The remains of the settlement (tell) provide insight into the development of Edfu as a provincial town from the end of the Old Kingdom until the Byzantine period. The settlement at Edfu was the capital of the Second Upper Egypt nome, and played an important role within the region. The oldest part of the town which can be dated to the late Old Kingdom lies on the eastern part of the tell, not far from the Ptolemaic temple. There is evidence that the town flourished during the First Intermediate Period when it expanded extensively to the west. It is one of few settlements in southern Egypt that thrived when it seems that the north, especially around the delta, was in economic decline.

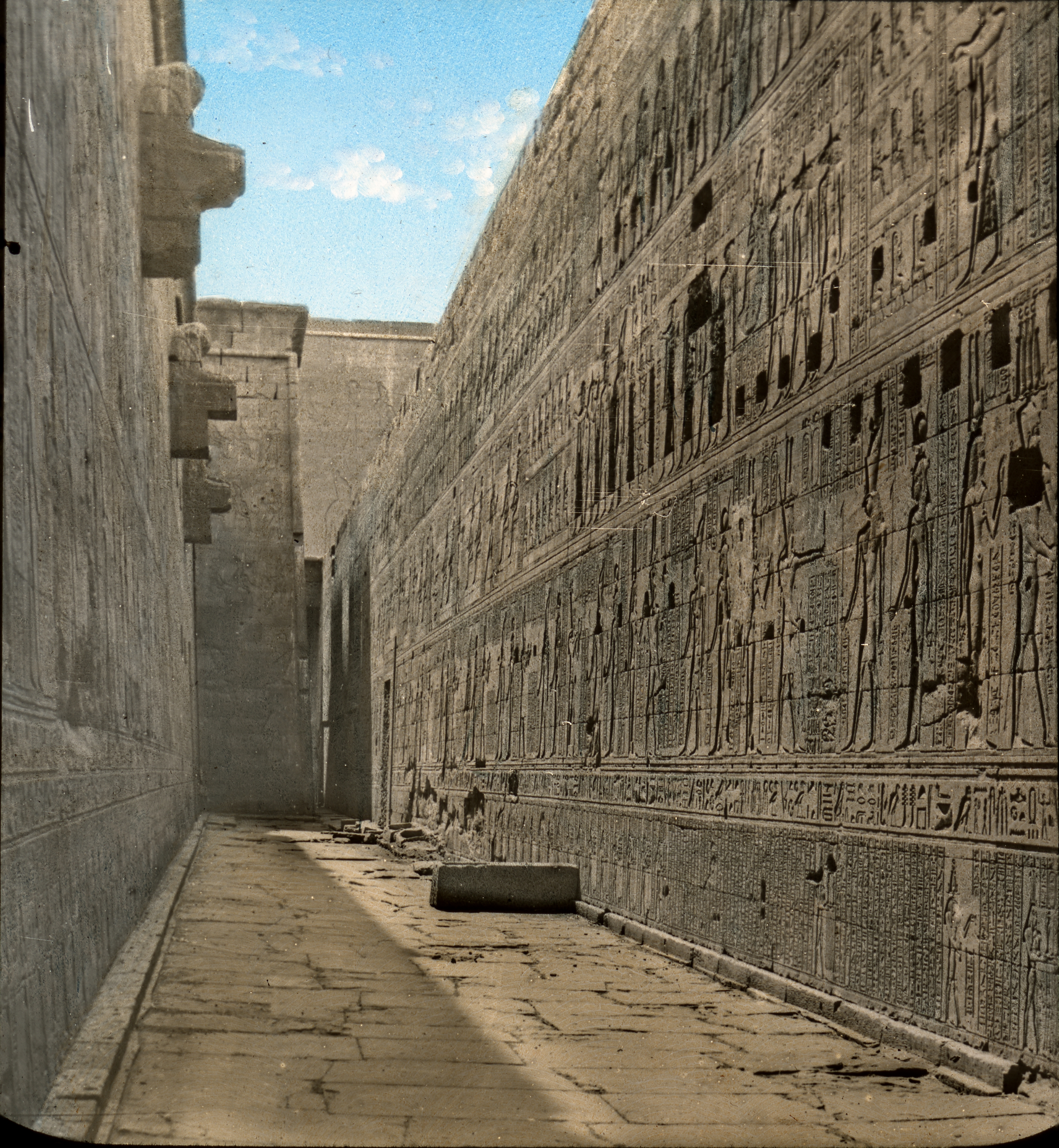
Lantern Slide Collection: Views, Objects: Egypt. Edfu [selected images]. View 01: Egypt - Edfu., n.d. Brooklyn Museum Archives

Today, the ancient mound of Tell Edfu is preserved in some areas up to 20 m high and contains complete archaeological sequences of occupation dating to the Old Kingdom until the Graeco-Roman period, more than 3000 years of history, therefore providing ideal conditions to study the development of a provincial town. A central part of the site was explored by Henri Henne from the Institute for Egyptology in Lille in 1921 and 1922. His team identified the remains of a small sanctuary from the Late or Ptolemaic period, possibly the Osiris chapel built by Psamtek I. Henne was followed by Octave Guéraud in 1928 then by Maurice Alliot in 1931 who each explored and excavated different aspects of the settlement remains. The top layers of the settlement containing the Byzantine, Roman and Ptolemaic remains and the Old and Middle Kingdom cemetery at the southern western corner were recorded by a Franco-Polish expedition in 1937–39. The expedition was organized in cooperation between the University of Warsaw and the Institut français d’archéologie orientale (IFAO) in Cairo, and was directed by B. Bruyère, J. Manteuffel and Kazimierz Michałowski. Three elaborate reports on the archaeology of Tell Edfu were published. Unfortunately, since mid-1939 no new detailed discoveries or thorough research has been completed at the tell except for recent work done by Barry Kemp, from the University of Cambridge. Since 2001, the Tell Edfu project has been directed by Nadine Moeller (Then Oriental Institute, University of Chicago, now Yale University). The current work focuses on the eastern part of the site. So far the administrative centre of the ancient town has been discovered with remains of a columned hall dating to the late Middle Kingdom as well as a large granary courtyard that functioned as a grain reserve for this provincial capital. Latter dates to the Second Intermediate Period (17th Dynasty). At least seven large round silos have been excavated here with a diameter between 5.5 and 6.5 meters which makes them the largest ones so far discovered within an ancient Egyptian urban centre.

=== 3rd Dynasty Pyramid ruins ===
The remains of one of seven small provincial step pyramids built along the Nile Valley, is situated about 5 km south of Edfu near the west bank village of Naga el-Goneima. The structure was built from rough reddish sandstone and rises to a present height of 5.5 m. The pyramid has been loosely attributed to King Huni of the Third Dynasty. The purpose of these pyramids is unknown. Further investigations and a detailed survey are carried out by the Oriental Institute, University of Chicago since 2010.

=== 5th and 6th dynasties ===
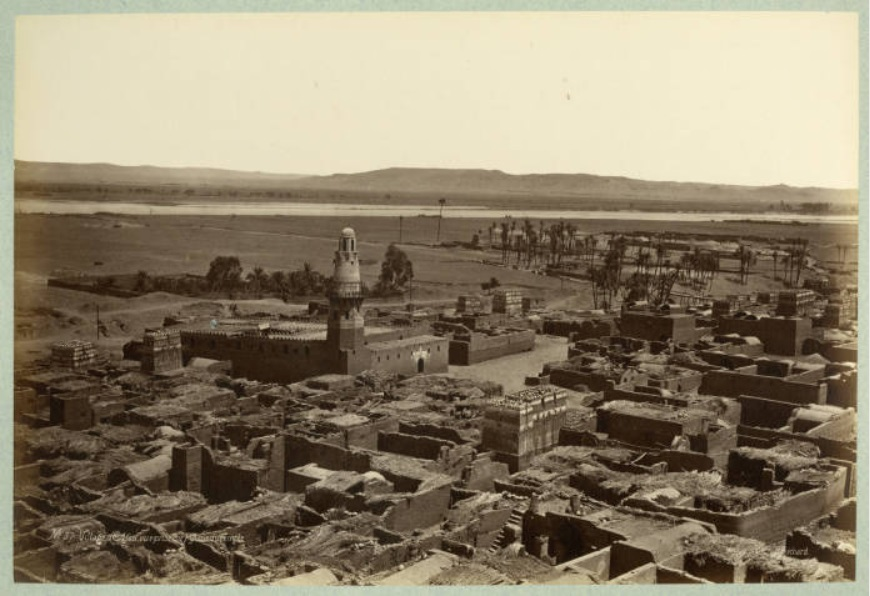
The village of Edfu, as seen from the pylon of the Temple of Edfu

No larger remains dating earlier than the 5th Dynasty have been found at Edfu. The ancient cemetery comprised mastabas of the Old Kingdom as well as later tombs. Before the beginning of the New Kingdom, the necropolis was transferred to Hager Edfu, to the west and then in the Late period to the south at Nag’ el-Hassaya. The entire area was called Behedet. The god Horus was herein worshipped as Horus Behedet.

One of these mastabas belonged to Izi, a local administrator, who, it was quoted was the "great chief of the Nome of Edfu" in the Sixth Dynasty. Isi lived during the reign of King Djedkare Isesi of the Fifth and into the reign of Pepi I of the Sixth Dynasties. He was an administrator, judge, chief of the royal archives and a "Great One among the Tens of the South" [ref?]. Isi later became a living god and was so worshipped during the Middle Kingdom. As the Sixth Dynasty and the Old Kingdom drew to a close, local regional governors and administrative nobles took on a larger power in their areas, away from the royal central authority.

=== Temple of Horus ===
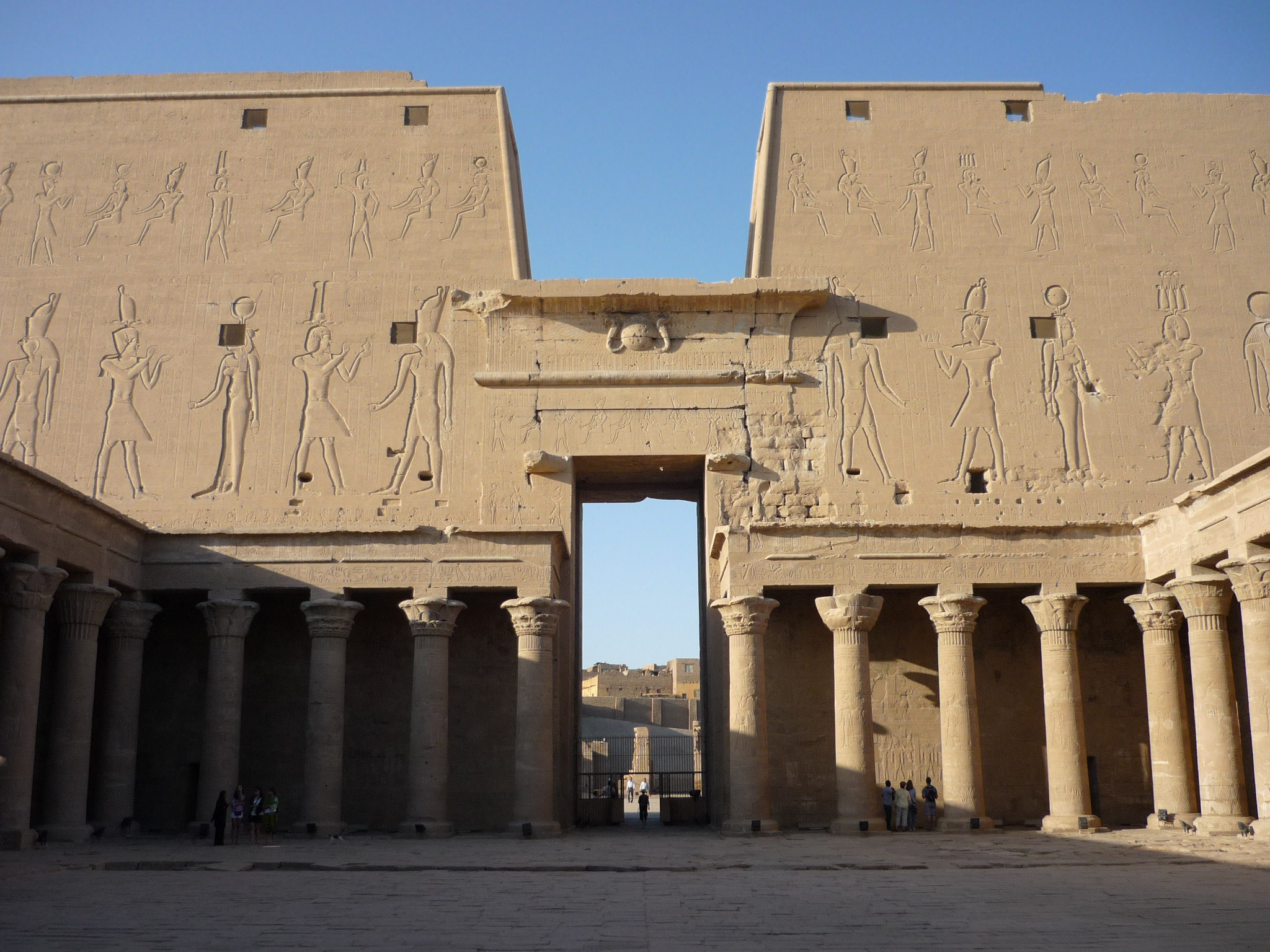
The forecourt of the temple, looking south-east

The town is known for the major Ptolemaic temple, built between 237 BC and 57 BC, into the reign of Cleopatra VII. Of all the temple remains in Egypt, the Temple of Horus at Edfu is the most completely preserved. Built from sandstone blocks, the huge Ptolemaic temple was constructed over the site of a smaller New Kingdom temple, oriented east to west, facing towards the river. The later structure faces north to south and leaves the ruined remains of the older temple pylon to be seen on the east side of the first court.

=== Apollonopolis Magna ===
In the Hellenistic period and under the Roman Empire, the city was known as Apollonopolis Magna or Apollinopolis Magna (Greek: πόλις μεγάλη Ἀπόλλωνος, Strabo xvii. p. 817; Agartharch. p. 22; Plin. v. 9. s. 11; Plut. Is. et Osir. 50; Aelian. Hist. An. x. 2; Ptol. iv. 5. § 70; Ἀπολλωνία, Steph. Byzant. s. v.; Ἀπολλωνιάς, Hierocl. p. 732; It. Ant. p. 160, 174; Not. Imp. Orient. c. 143; Latin: Apollonos Superioris [urbs]). Ptolemy assigns Apollinopolis to the Hermonthite nome, but it was more commonly regarded as the capital town of the nome Apollopolites. Under the Roman emperors it was the headquarters of the Legio II Trajana.

The ancient city derived its principal reputation from two temples, which are considered second only to the Temple of Dendera as specimens of the sacred structures of Egypt. The larger temple is in good preservation, and is being excavated. The smaller temple, sometimes, but improperly, called a Typhonium, is apparently an appendage of the former, and its sculptures represent the birth and education of the youthful deity, Horus, whose parents Noum, or Kneph and Athor, were worshipped in the larger edifice. The principal temple is dedicated to Noum, whose symbol is the disc of the sun, supported by two asps and the extended wings of a vulture. Its sculptures represent (Rosellini, Monum. del Culto, p. 240, tav. xxxviii.) the progress of the Sun, Phre-Hor-Hat, Lord of Heaven, moving in his bark (Bari) through the circle of the Hours. The local name of the district round Apollinopolis was Hat, and Noum was styled Hor-hat-kah, or Horus, the tutelary genius of the land of Hat. This deity forms also at Apollinopolis a triad with the goddess Athor and Hor-Senet. The members of the triad are youthful gods, pointing their fingers towards their mouths, and before the decipherment of the hieroglyphics were regarded as figures of Harpocrates.

The entrance into the larger temple of Apollinopolis is a gateway (πυλών) 50 feet high, flanked by two converging wings (πτερά) in the form of truncated pyramids, rising to 107 feet (33 m). The wings contain ten stories, are pierced by round loop-holes for the admission of light, and probably served as chambers or dormitories for the priests and servitors of the temple. From the jambs of the door project two blocks of stone, which were intended, as Ddnon supposes, to support the heads of two colossal figures. This propylaeon leads into a large square, surrounded by a colonnade roofed with squared granite, and on the opposite side is a pronaos or portico, 53 feet (16 m) in height, and having a triple row of columns, six in each row, with variously and gracefully foliaged capitals. The temple is 145 feet (44 m) wide, and 424 feet (129 m) long from the entrance to the opposite end. Every part of the walls is covered with hieroglyphics, and the main court ascends gradually to the pronaos by broad steps. The whole area of the building was surrounded by a wall 20 feet (6.1 m) high, of great thickness. Like so many of the Egyptian temples, that of Apollinopolis was capable of being employed as a fortress. It stood about a third of a mile from the river. The sculptures, although carefully and indeed beautifully executed, are of the Ptolemaic era, the earliest portion of the temple having been erected by Ptolemy VI Philometor in 181 BC.

Apollonopolis Magna became a Christian bishopric, a suffragan of the metropolitan see of Ptolemais, the capital of the Roman province of Thebais Secunda. Papyrus documents record the names of perhaps five of its bishops. No longer a residential bishopric, Apollonopolis Magna is today listed by the Catholic Church as a titular see.

=== 19th-century ===
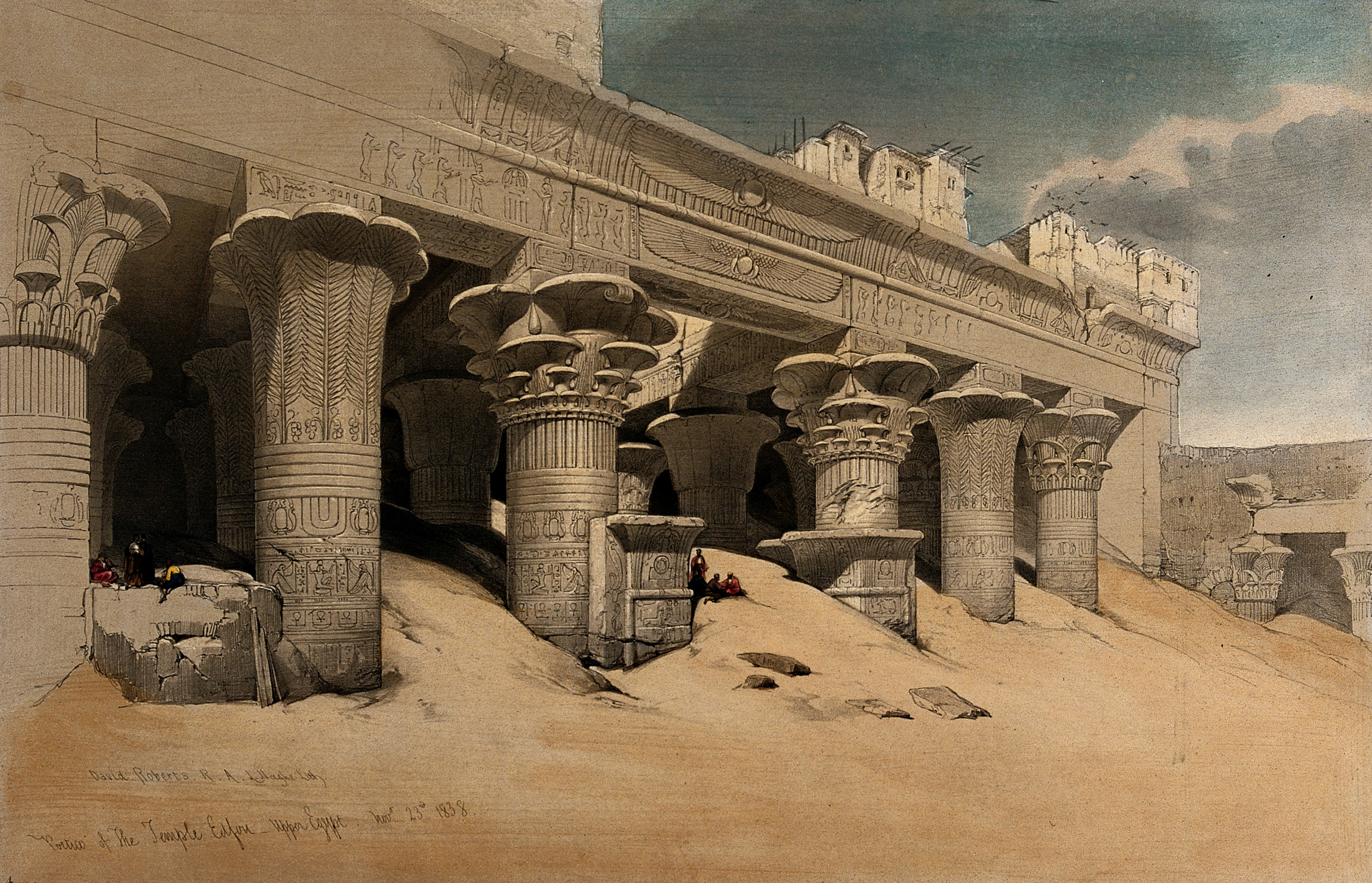
David Roberts, Temple of Horus (November 23, 1838)

In 1848, the population was approximately 2,000 inhabitants. At that time the homes of the people were clustered around and, in some cases, atop, the ancient ruins and temples. The main business of the town was making earthenware vessels of the type found in ancient Egyptian tombs.

In 1860, the French archaeologist Auguste Mariette had the sand, rubbish and mud-brick houses cleared from the precinct of the Temple of Horus. This revealed the temple to be largely intact.

Among the tourists who visited the town was the Prince of Wales who arrived in 1862 and in whose entourage was the photographer Francis Bedford. Other 19th-century visitors include the artists David Roberts and Frederic Norden.

=== 20th-century ===
Edfu continued to be a popular destination for tourists in the 20th century. Cruise ships on the Nile would tie up on river-side quays where passengers would go ashore. Horse-drawn vehicles and drivers were available there for hire to take them to the temple precincts where tour guides would explain the history and significance of the site.

== Geography ==
=== Climate ===
Köppen-Geiger climate classification system classifies its climate as hot desert (BWh).

Climate data for Edfu
Month	Jan	Feb	Mar	Apr	May	Jun	Jul	Aug	Sep	Oct	Nov	Dec	Year
Mean daily maximum °C (°F)	23.6 (74.5)	25.6 (78.1)	29.4 (84.9)	34.4 (93.9)	38.7 (101.7)	40.6 (105.1)	40.5 (104.9)	40.5 (104.9)	38.3 (100.9)	35.8 (96.4)	30.3 (86.5)	25.2 (77.4)	33.6 (92.4)
Daily mean °C (°F)	15.5 (59.9)	17 (63)	20.6 (69.1)	25.4 (77.7)	29.9 (85.8)	31.7 (89.1)	32.1 (89.8)	32.1 (89.8)	30.2 (86.4)	27.5 (81.5)	22 (72)	17.2 (63.0)	25.1 (77.3)
Mean daily minimum °C (°F)	7.5 (45.5)	8.5 (47.3)	11.9 (53.4)	16.5 (61.7)	21.1 (70.0)	22.9 (73.2)	23.7 (74.7)	23.8 (74.8)	22.1 (71.8)	19.2 (66.6)	13.7 (56.7)	9.3 (48.7)	16.7 (62.0)
Average precipitation mm (inches)	0 (0)	0 (0)	0 (0)	0 (0)	0 (0)	0 (0)	0 (0)	0 (0)	0 (0)	0 (0)	0 (0)	0 (0)	0 (0)
Source: Climate-Data.org

== See also ==
- List of ancient Egyptian towns and cities
- Edfu-Project
