= Egyptian temple =

Religious buildings in Ancient Egypt

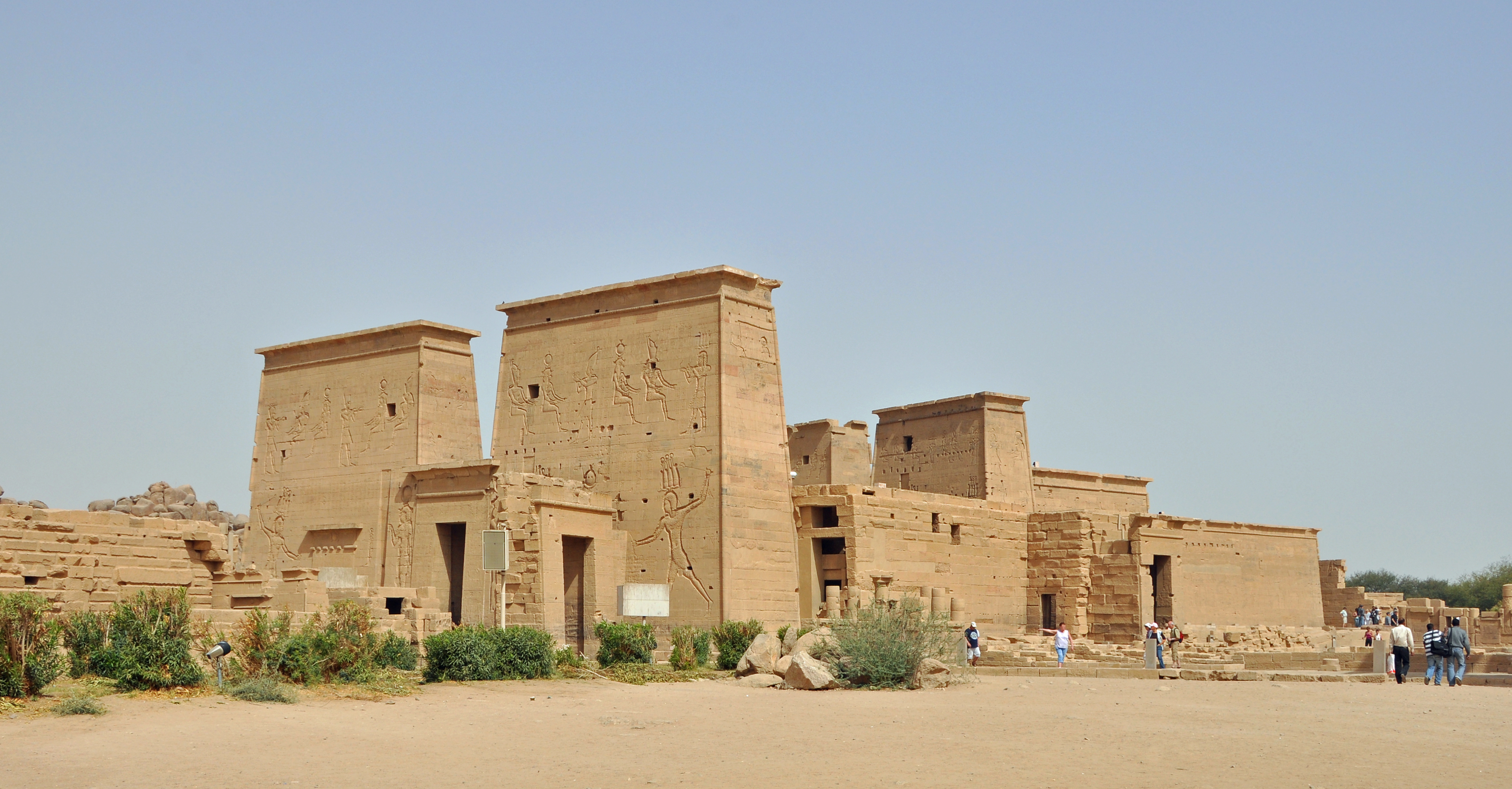
The Temple of Isis at Philae, consisting of pylons and an enclosed court on the left and the inner building on the right. Constructed around the 4th century BC.

Egyptian temples were places of worship built across ancient Egypt for the sake of the gods and goddesses and in commemoration of the reigning pharaoh. They were seen as houses for the gods or kings to whom they were dedicated. Performed within them were the central rituals of the Egyptian religion: giving offerings to the gods; re-enacting their mythology through festivals; and warding off the forces of chaos. These rituals were seen as necessary for the gods to continue to uphold ma'at—the divine order of the universe. Caring for the gods was the obligation of every pharaoh, who dedicated prodigious resources to temple construction and maintenance. Pharaohs delegated most of their ritual duties to priests, but most of the populace was excluded from direct participation in ceremonies and forbidden to enter a temple's most sacred areas. Nevertheless, a temple was an important religious site for all social classes of the Egyptian people, who went there to pray, give offerings, and seek guidance from an oracle.

The most important part of the temple was the sanctuary, which typically contained a cult image of its god. The rooms outside the sanctuary grew larger and more elaborate over time such that temples evolved from small shrines in late prehistoric Egypt (late 4th millennium BC) to large stone edifices in the New Kingdom (c. 1570–1069 BC) and later. These edifices are among the largest and most enduring examples of ancient Egyptian architecture, with their elements arranged and decorated according to complex religious symbolism. Their typical layout comprised a series of enclosed halls, open courts, and entrance pylons aligned along the path used for festival processions. Beyond the temple proper was an outer wall enclosing secondary buildings.

A large temple owned sizable tracts of land and employed thousands of laymen to supply its needs. Thus, temples were also key economic centres in addition to religious ones. The priests who managed these powerful institutions wielded considerable influence, and despite their ostensible subordination to the king, they may have posed significant challenges to his authority.

Temple-building in Egypt continued despite the nation's decline and ultimate loss of independence to the Roman Empire in 30 BC. With the rise of Christianity in the 1st century, the Egyptian religion faced increasing persecution and temple cults died out between the 4th and 6th centuries, with their buildings suffering centuries of destruction and neglect afterwards. In the early 19th century, a wave of interest in ancient Egypt swept Europe, giving rise to the scientific discipline of Egyptology and drawing increasing numbers of visitors to the civilization's remains. Dozens of temples survive, and some have become world-famous tourist attractions that contribute significantly to the modern Egyptian economy. Egyptologists continue to study the surviving temples and the remains of destroyed ones for further information about ancient Egyptian society.

== Functions ==
=== Religious ===
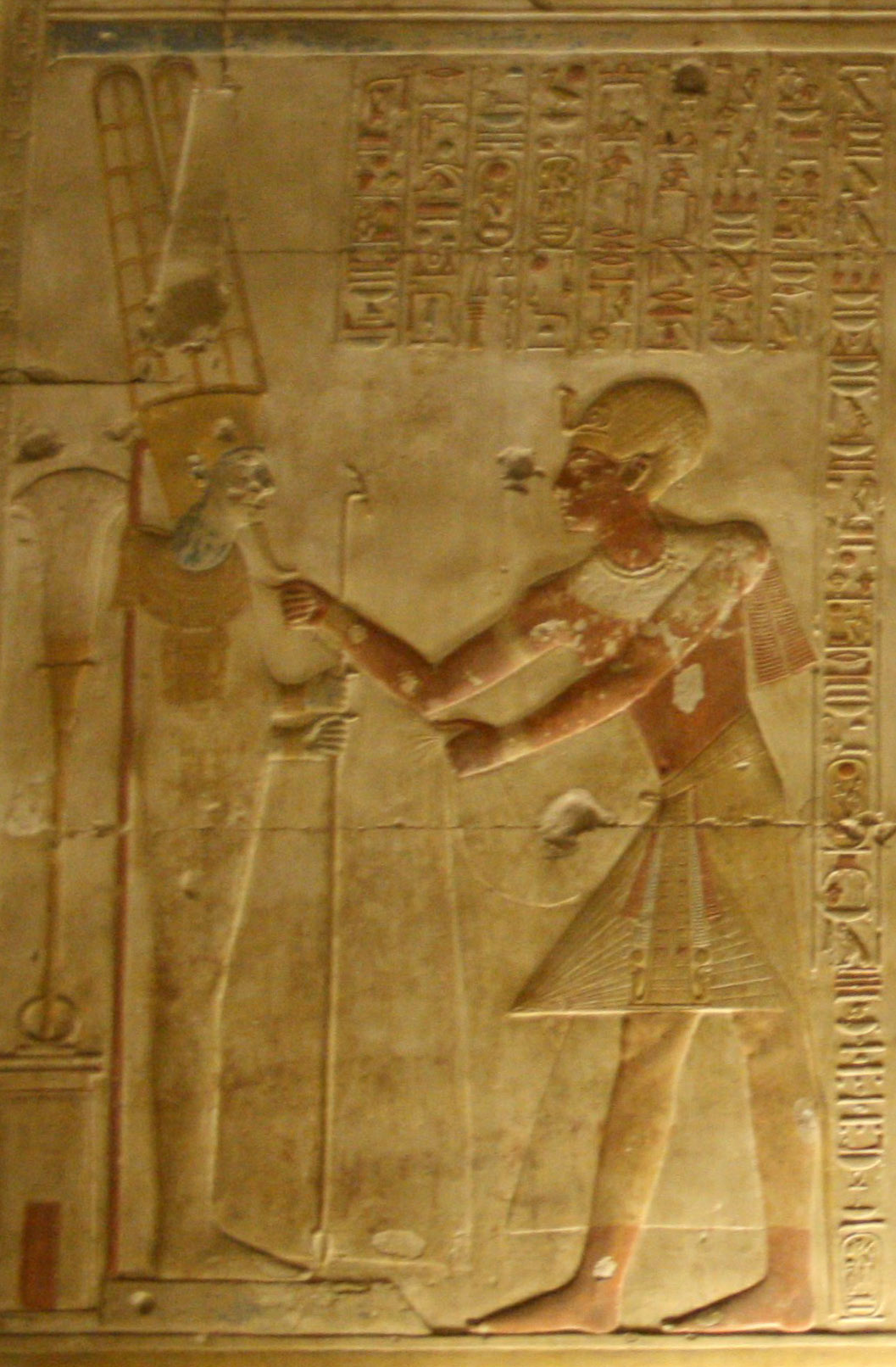
Low relief of Seti I performing rituals for the god Amun, from Seti's mortuary temple at Abydos. Thirteenth century BC

Ancient Egyptian temples were meant as places for the gods to reside on earth. Indeed, the term the Egyptians most commonly used to describe the temple building, ḥwt-nṯr, means "mansion (or enclosure) of a god". A divine presence in the temple linked the human and divine realms and allowed humans to interact with the god through ritual. These rituals, it was believed, sustained the god and allowed it to continue to play its proper role in nature. They were therefore a key part of the maintenance of maat, the ideal order of nature and of human society in Egyptian belief. Maintaining maat was the entire purpose of Egyptian religion, and it was the purpose of a temple as well.

Because he was credited with divine power himself, (Note: Many Egyptologists, such as Wolfgang Helck and Dietrich Wildung, have argued that the Egyptians did not believe their kings were divine. Nevertheless, the divinity of the king is constantly emphasized in official writings: the products of the royal court and religious establishment. Therefore, regardless of whether ordinary Egyptians believed in it, the king's divine nature is key to the ideology of the Egyptian temple.) the pharaoh, as a sacred king, was regarded as Egypt's representative to the gods and its most important upholder of maat. Thus, it was theoretically his duty to perform the temple rites. While it is uncertain how often he participated in ceremonies, the existence of temples across Egypt made it impossible for him to do so in all cases, and most of the time these duties were delegated to priests. The pharaoh was nevertheless obligated to maintain, provide for, and expand the temples throughout his realm.

Although the pharaoh delegated his authority, the performance of temple rituals was still an official duty, restricted to high-ranking priests. The participation of the general populace in most ceremonies was prohibited. Much of the lay religious activity in Egypt instead took place in private and community shrines, separate from official temples. As the primary link between the human and divine realms, temples attracted considerable veneration from ordinary Egyptians.

Each temple had a principal deity, and most were dedicated to other gods as well. Not all deities had temples dedicated to them. Many demons and household gods were involved primarily in magical or private religious practice, with little or no presence in temple ceremonies. There were also other gods who had significant roles in the cosmos but, for unclear reasons, were not honored with temples of their own. Of those gods who did have temples of their own, many were venerated mainly in certain areas of Egypt, though many gods with a strong local tie were also important across the nation. Even deities whose worship spanned the country were strongly associated with the cities where their chief temples were located. In Egyptian creation myths, the first temple originated as a shelter for a god—which god it was varied according to the city—that stood on the mound of land where the process of creation began. Each temple in Egypt, therefore, was equated with this original temple and with the site of creation itself. As the primordial home of the god and the mythological location of the city's founding, the temple was seen as the hub of the region, from which the city's patron god ruled over it.

Pharaohs also built temples where offerings were made to sustain their spirits in the afterlife, often linked with or located near their tombs. These temples are traditionally called "mortuary temples" and regarded as essentially different from divine temples. In recent years some Egyptologists, such as Gerhard Haeny, have argued that there is no clear division between the two. The Egyptians did not refer to mortuary temples by any distinct name. (Note: The phrase "mansion of millions of years" is often taken as the Egyptian term for a mortuary temple. In several instances the Egyptians used this phrase to refer to sacred buildings that are not generally regarded as "mortuary", such as Luxor Temple and the Festival Hall of Thutmose III at Karnak. Patricia Spencer suggests that the term applied to "any temple in which the cult of the king was observed, even if the temple was dedicated, in the first instance, to the chief god of the area.") Nor were rituals for the dead and rituals for the gods mutually exclusive; the symbolism surrounding death was present in all Egyptian temples. The worship of gods was present to some degree in mortuary temples, and the Egyptologist Stephen Quirke has said that "at all periods royal cult involves the gods, but equally... all cult of the gods involves the king". Even so, certain temples were clearly used to commemorate deceased kings and to give offerings to their spirits. Their purpose is not fully understood; they may have been meant to unite the king with the gods, elevating him to a divine status greater than that of ordinary kingship. In any case, the difficulty of separating divine and mortuary temples reflects the close intertwining of divinity and kingship in Egyptian belief.

=== Economic and administrative ===
Temples were key centers of economic activity. The largest required prodigious resources and employed tens of thousands of priests, craftsmen, and laborers. The temple's economic workings were analogous to those of a large Egyptian household, with servants dedicated to serving the temple god as they might serve the master of an estate. This similarity is reflected in the Egyptian term for temple lands and their administration, pr, meaning "house" or "estate".

Some of the temple's supplies came from direct donations by the king. In the New Kingdom, when Egypt was an imperial power, these donations often came out of the spoils of the king's military campaigns or the tribute given by his client states. The king might also levy various taxes that went directly to support a temple. Other revenue came from private individuals, who offered land, slaves, or goods to temples in exchange for a supply of offerings and priestly services to sustain their spirits in the afterlife.

Sunk relief of personified provinces of Egypt bearing offerings for the temple god, from the mortuary temple of Ramesses II at Abydos. Thirteenth century BC

Much of a temple's economic support came from its own resources. These included large tracts of land beyond the temple enclosure, sometimes in a completely different region than the temple itself. The most important type of property was farmland, producing grain, fruit, or wine, or supporting herds of livestock. The temple either managed these lands directly, rented them out to farmers for a share of the produce, or managed them jointly with the royal administration. Temples also launched expeditions into the desert to collect resources such as salt, honey, or wild game, or to mine precious minerals. Some owned fleets of ships with which to conduct their own trade across the country or even beyond Egypt's borders. Thus, as Richard H. Wilkinson says, the temple estate "often represented no less than a slice of Egypt itself". As a major economic center and the employer of a large part of the local population, the temple enclosure was a key part of the town in which it stood. Conversely, when a temple was founded on empty land, a new town was built to support it.

All this economic power was ultimately under the pharaoh's control, and temple products and property were often taxed. Their employees, even the priests, were subject to the state corvée system, which conscripted labor for royal projects. They could also be ordered to provide supplies for some specific purposes. A trading expedition led by Harkhuf in the Sixth Dynasty (c. 2255–2246 BC) was allowed to procure supplies from any temple it wished, and the mortuary temples of the Theban Necropolis in the New Kingdom oversaw the provision of the royally employed tomb workers at Deir el-Medina. Kings could also exempt temples or classes of personnel from taxation and conscription.

The royal administration could also order one temple to divert its resources to another temple whose influence it wished to expand. Thus, a king might increase the income of the temples of a god he favored, and mortuary temples of recent rulers tended to siphon off resources from temples to pharaohs long dead. The most drastic means of controlling the temple estates was to completely revise the distribution of their property nationwide, which might extend to closing down certain temples. Such changes could significantly alter Egypt's economic landscape. The temples were thus important instruments with which the king managed the nation's resources and its people. As the direct overseers of their own economic sphere, the administrations of large temples wielded considerable influence and may have posed a challenge to the authority of a weak pharaoh, although it is unclear how independent they were.

Once Egypt became a Roman province, one of the first measures of the Roman rulers was to implement a reform on land possession and taxation. The Egyptian temples, as important landowners, were made to either pay rent to the government for the land they owned or surrender that land to the state in exchange for a government stipend. However, the temples and priests continued to enjoy privileges under Roman rule, e.g., exemption from taxes and compulsory services. On the official level, the leading officials of the temples became part of the Roman ruling apparatus by, for example, collecting taxes and examining charges against priests for violating sacral law.

== Development ==
=== Early development ===
The earliest known shrines appeared in prehistoric Egypt in the late fourth millennium BC, at sites such as Saïs and Buto in Lower Egypt and Nekhen and Coptos in Upper Egypt. Most of these shrines were made of perishable materials such as wood, reed matting, and mudbrick. Despite the impermanence of these early buildings, later Egyptian art continually reused and adapted elements from them, evoking the ancient shrines to suggest the eternal nature of the gods and their dwelling places.

In the Early Dynastic Period (c. 3100–2686 BC), the first pharaohs built funerary complexes in the religious center of Abydos following a single general pattern, with a rectangular mudbrick enclosure. In the Old Kingdom (c. 2686–2181 BC) that followed the Early Dynastic Period, royal funerary monuments greatly expanded, while most divine temples remained comparatively small, suggesting that official religion in this period emphasized the cult of the king more than the direct worship of deities. Deities closely connected with the king, such as the sun god Ra, received more royal contributions than other deities. Ra's temple at Heliopolis was a major religious center, and several Old Kingdom pharaohs built large sun temples in his honor near their pyramids. Meanwhile, the small provincial temples retained a variety of local styles from Predynastic times, unaffected by the royal cult sites.

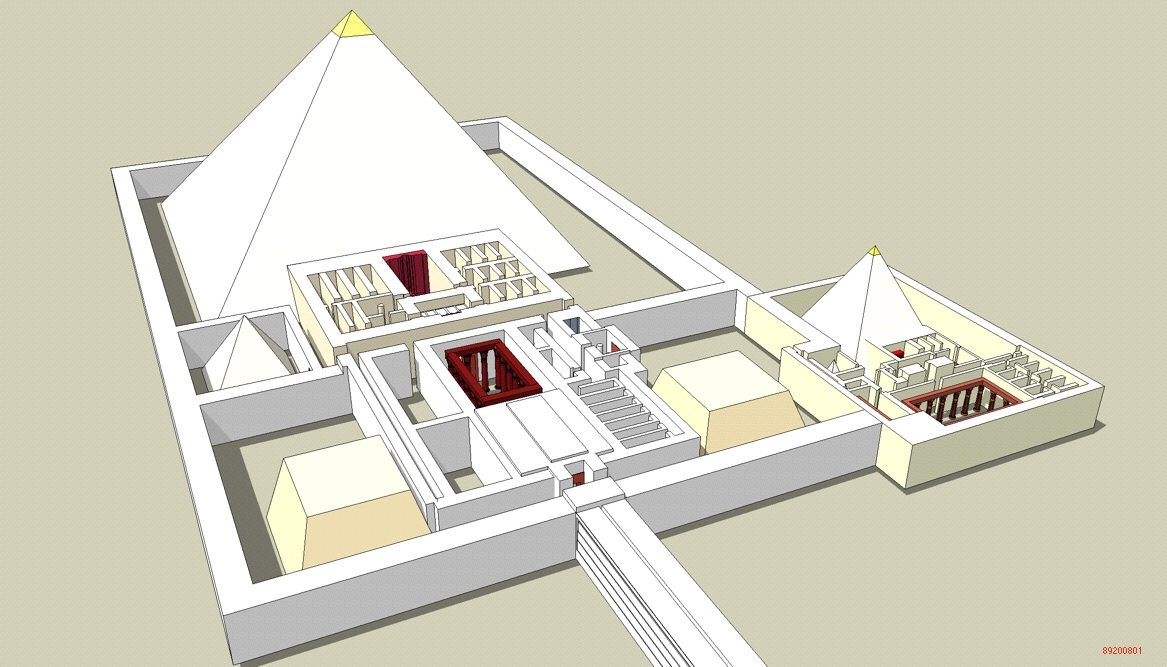
Reconstruction of the Old Kingdom pyramid temple of Djedkare Isesi, with causeway leading out to the valley temple. Twenty-fourth century BC.

The expansion of funerary monuments began in the reign of Djoser, who built his complex entirely of stone and placed in the enclosure a step pyramid under which he was buried: the Pyramid of Djoser. For the rest of the Old Kingdom, tomb and temple were joined in elaborate stone pyramid complexes. Near each pyramid complex was a town that supplied its needs, as towns would support temples throughout Egyptian history. Other changes came in the reign of Sneferu who, beginning with his first pyramid at Meidum, built pyramid complexes symmetrically along an east–west axis, with a valley temple on the banks of the Nile linked to a pyramid temple at the foot of the pyramid. Sneferu's immediate successors followed this pattern, but beginning in the late Old Kingdom, pyramid complexes combined different elements from the axial plan and from the rectangular plan of Djoser. To supply the pyramid complexes, kings founded new towns and farming estates on undeveloped lands across Egypt. The flow of goods from these lands to the central government and its temples helped unify the kingdom.

The rulers of the Middle Kingdom (c. 2055–1650 BC) continued building pyramids and their associated complexes. The rare remains from Middle Kingdom temples, like the one at Medinet Madi, show that temple plans grew more symmetrical during that period, and divine temples made increasing use of stone. The pattern of a sanctuary lying behind a pillared hall frequently appears in Middle Kingdom temples, and sometimes these two elements are fronted by open courts, foreshadowing the standard temple layout used in later times.

=== New Kingdom ===
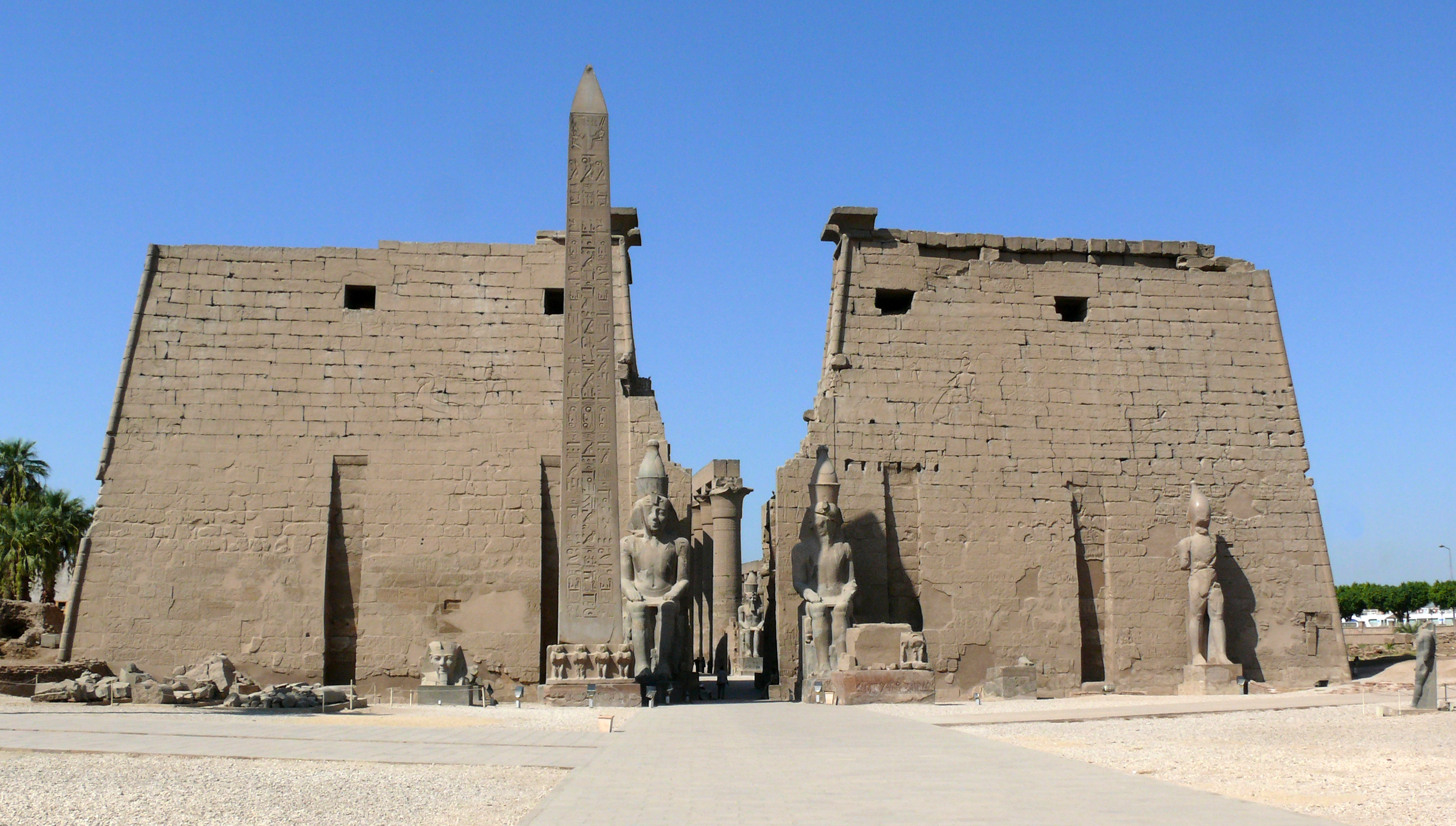
Entrance pylon of Luxor Temple, one of the major New Kingdom temples. Fourteenth to thirteenth century BC.

With greater power and wealth during the New Kingdom (c. 1550–1070 BC), Egypt devoted still more resources to its temples, which grew larger and more elaborate. Higher-ranking priestly roles became permanent rather than rotating positions, and they controlled a large portion of Egypt's wealth. Anthony Spalinger suggests that, as the influence of temples expanded, religious celebrations that had once been fully public were absorbed into the temples' increasingly important festival rituals. The most important god of the time was Amun, whose main cult center, the Precinct of Amun-Re at Karnak in Thebes, eventually became the largest of all temples, and whose high priests may have wielded considerable political influence.

Many temples were now built entirely of stone, and their general plan became fixed, with the sanctuary, halls, courtyards, and pylon gateways oriented along the path used for festival processions. New Kingdom pharaohs ceased using pyramids as funerary monuments and placed their tombs a great distance from their mortuary temples. Without pyramids to build around, mortuary temples began using the same plan as those dedicated to the gods.

In the middle of the New Kingdom, Pharaoh Akhenaten promoted the god Aten over all others and eventually abolished the official worship of most other gods. Traditional temples were neglected while new Aten temples, differing sharply in design and construction, were erected. But Akhenaten's revolution was reversed soon after his death, with the traditional cults reinstated and the new temples dismantled. Subsequent pharaohs dedicated still more resources to the temples, particularly Ramesses II, the most prolific monument-builder in Egyptian history. As the wealth of the priesthoods continued to grow, so did their religious influence: temple oracles, controlled by the priests, were an increasingly popular method of making decisions. Pharaonic power waned, and in the eleventh century BC a military leader Herihor made himself High Priest of Amun and the de facto ruler of Upper Egypt, beginning the political fragmentation of the Third Intermediate Period (c. 1070–664 BC).

As the New Kingdom crumbled, the building of mortuary temples ceased and was never revived. Some rulers of the Third Intermediate Period, such as those at Tanis, were buried within the enclosures of divine temples, thus continuing the close link between temple and tomb.

=== Later development ===
In the Third Intermediate Period and the following Late Period (664–323 BC), the weakened Egyptian state fell to a series of outside powers, experiencing only occasional periods of independence. Many of these foreign rulers funded and expanded temples to strengthen their claim to the kingship of Egypt. One such group, the Kushite pharaohs of the eighth and seventh centuries BC, adopted Egyptian-style temple architecture for use in their native land of Nubia, beginning a long tradition of sophisticated Nubian temple building. Amid this turmoil, the fortunes of various temples and clergies shifted and the independence of Amun's priesthood was broken, but the power of the priesthood in general remained.

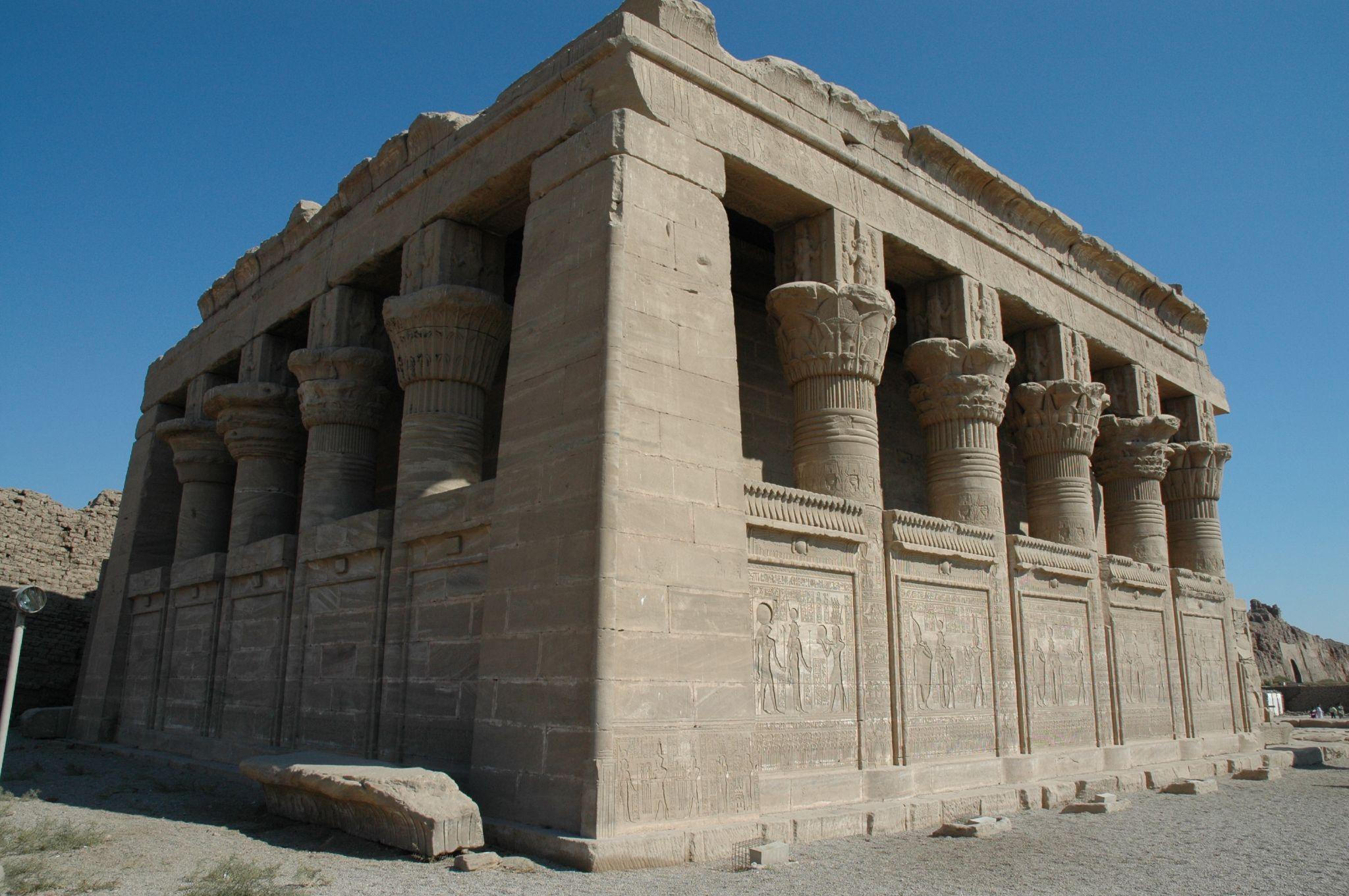
South-west exposure of the Roman-era mammisi at Dendera Temple complex. First to second century AD.

Despite the political upheaval, the Egyptian temple style continued to evolve without absorbing much foreign influence. Whereas earlier temple building mostly focused on male gods, goddesses and child deities grew increasingly prominent. Temples focused more on popular religious activities such as oracles, animal cults, and prayer. New architectural forms continued to develop, such as covered kiosks in front of gateways, more elaborate column styles, and the mammisi, a building celebrating the mythical birth of a god. Though the characteristics of the late temple style had developed by the last period of native rule, most of the examples date from the era of the Ptolemies, Greek kings who ruled as pharaohs for nearly 300 years.

After Rome conquered the Ptolemaic kingdom in 30 BC, Roman emperors took on the role of ruler and temple patron. Many temples in Roman Egypt continued to be built in Egyptian style. Others, including some that were dedicated to Egyptian gods—such as the temple to Isis at Ras el-Soda were built in a style derived from Roman architecture.

Temple-building continued into the third century AD. As the empire weakened in the crisis of the third century, imperial donations to the temple cults dried up, and almost all construction and decoration ceased. Cult activities at some sites continued, relying increasingly on financial support and volunteer labor from surrounding communities. In the following centuries, Christian emperors issued decrees that were increasingly hostile to pagan cults and temples. Some Christians attacked and destroyed temples, as in the plundering of the Serapeum and other temples in Alexandria in AD 391 or 392. Through some combination of Christian coercion and loss of funds, temples ceased to function at various times. The last temple cults died out in the fourth through sixth centuries AD, although locals may have venerated some sites long after the regular ceremonies there had ceased. (Note: Many temples were abandoned during or before the third century, although mentions of priests in papyrus texts show that some cults continued to exist until at least the 330s. The Temple of Isis at Philae, at Egypt's southern frontier with Nubia, was the last fully functioning temple. Scholars have traditionally believed, based on the writings of Procopius, that it was closed in about AD 535 by a military expedition under Justinian I. Jitse Dijkstra has argued that Procopius's account of the temple closure is inaccurate and that regular religious activity there ceased shortly after the last date inscribed at the temple, in AD 456 or 457. Eugene Cruz-Uribe suggests instead that during the fifth and early sixth centuries the temple lay empty most of the time, but that Nubians living nearby continued to hold periodic festivals there until well into the sixth century.)

== Construction ==
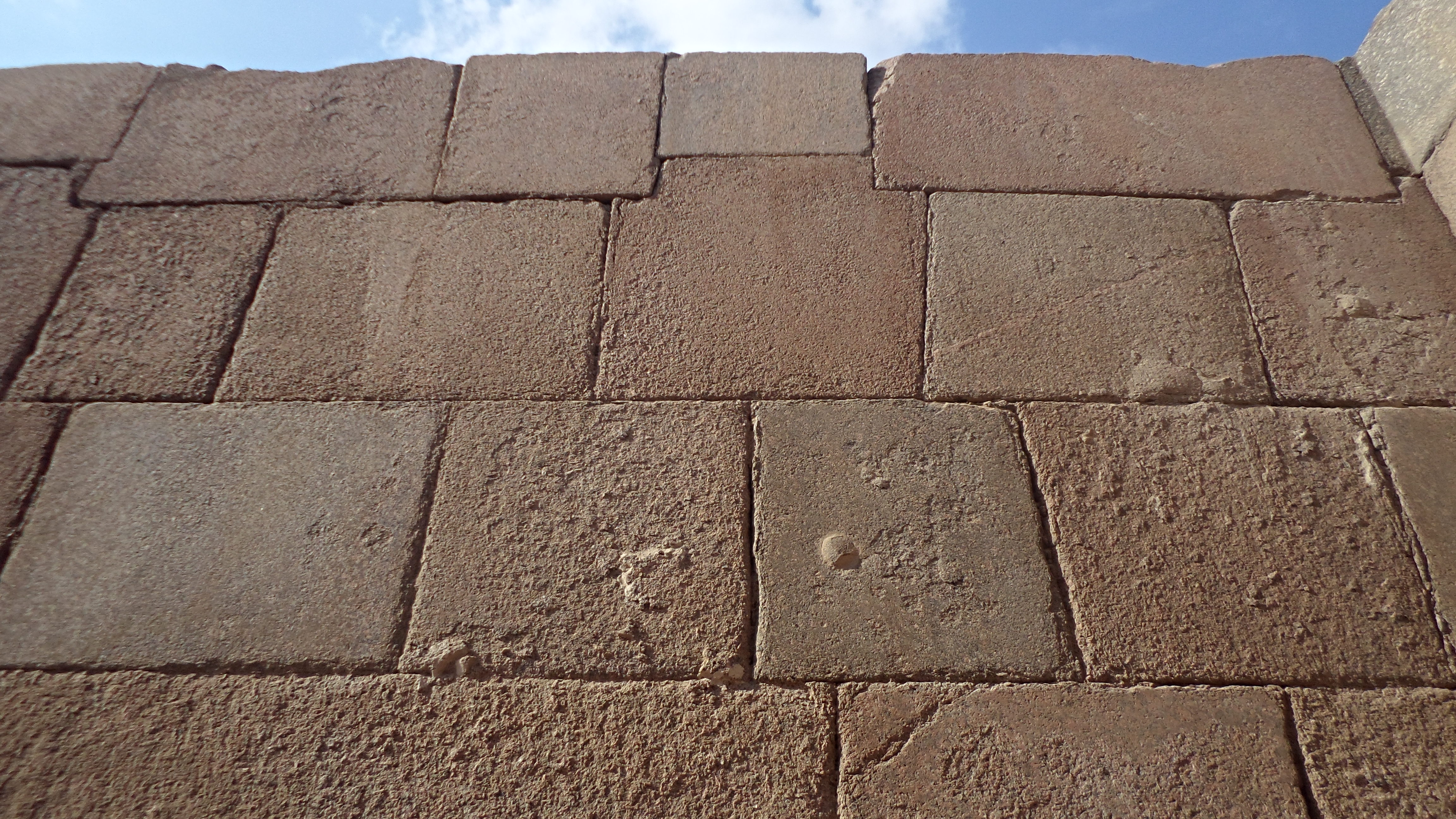
Stone construction in a wall of the Valley Temple of Khafre. Twenty-sixth century BC.

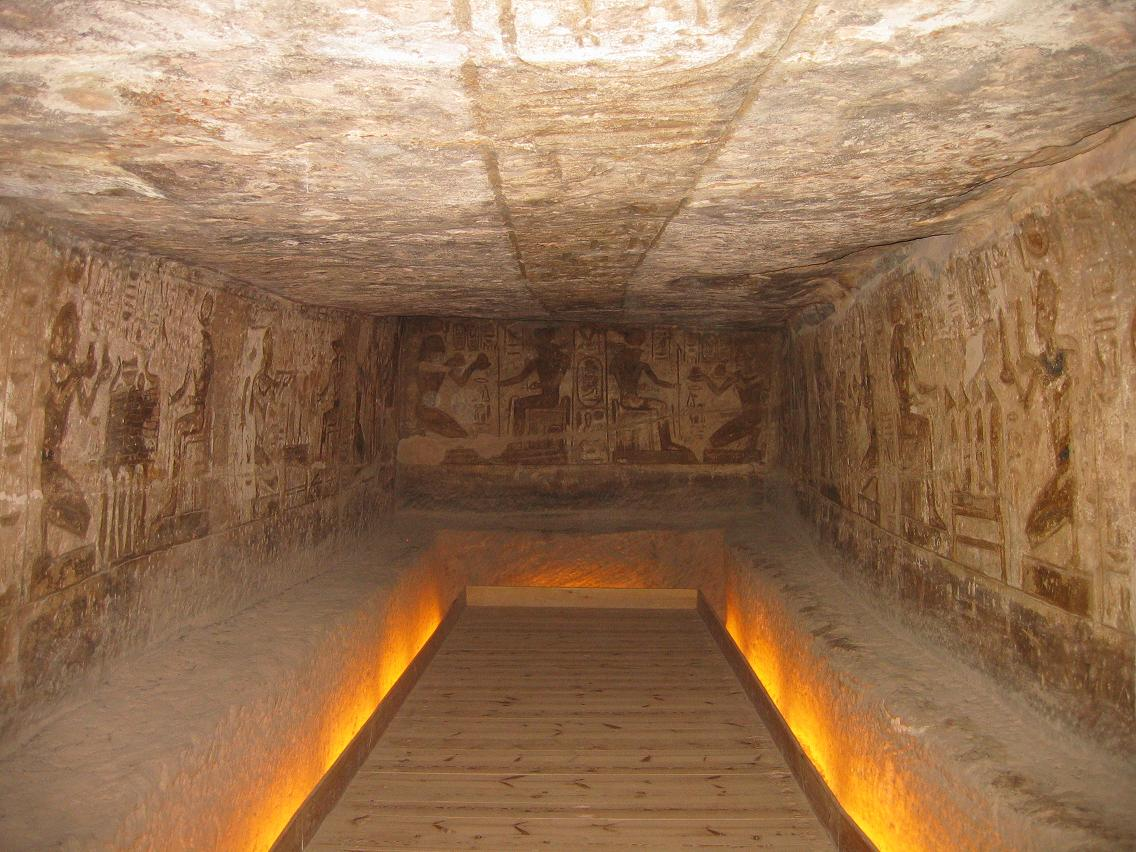
A rock-cut chamber in the Great Temple of Abu Simbel. Thirteenth century BC.

Temples were built throughout Upper and Lower Egypt, as well as at Egyptian-controlled oases in the Libyan Desert as far west as Siwa, and at outposts in the Sinai Peninsula such as Timna. In periods when Egypt dominated Nubia, Egyptian rulers also built temples there, as far south as Jebel Barkal. Most Egyptian towns had a temple, but in some cases, as with mortuary temples or the temples in Nubia, the temple was a new foundation on previously empty land. The exact site of a temple was often chosen for religious reasons; it might, for example, be the mythical birthplace or burial place of a god. The temple axis might also be designed to align with locations of religious significance, such as the site of a neighboring temple or the rising place of the sun or particular stars. The Great Temple of Abu Simbel, for instance, is aligned so that twice a year the rising sun illuminates the statues of the gods in its innermost room. Most temples were aligned toward the Nile with an axis running roughly east–west. (Note: Because the axis was aligned at 90 degrees from the river's generally north-south flow, irregularities in the Nile's course meant that the orientation did not always conform to true directions.)

An elaborate series of foundation rituals preceded construction. A further set of rituals followed the temple's completion, dedicating it to its patron god. These rites were conducted, at least in theory, by the king as part of his religious duties; indeed, in Egyptian belief, all temple construction was symbolically his work. In reality, it was the work of hundreds of his subjects, conscripted in the corvée system. The construction process for a new temple, or a major addition to an existing one, could last years or decades.

The use of stone in Egyptian temples emphasized their purpose as eternal houses for the gods and set them apart from buildings for the use of mortals, which were built of mudbrick. Early temples were built of brick and other perishable materials, and most of the outlying buildings in temple enclosures remained brick-built throughout Egyptian history. The main stones used in temple construction were limestone and sandstone, which are common in Egypt; stones that are harder and more difficult to carve, such as granite, were used in smaller amounts for individual elements like obelisks. The stone might be quarried nearby or shipped on the Nile from quarries elsewhere.

Temple structures were built on foundations of stone slabs set into sand-filled trenches. In most periods, walls and other structures were built with large blocks of varying shape. (Note: In their earliest stone constructions the Egyptians made small blocks shaped like mud bricks. Large blocks were typical of all other periods, except in the Amarna period, when temples to the Aten were built with small, standardized talatat blocks, possibly to speed up construction. Ptolemaic and Roman temples were built in regular courses, with the blocks within each course cut to the same height.) The blocks were laid in courses, usually without mortar. Each stone was dressed to fit with its neighbors, producing cuboid blocks whose uneven shapes interlocked. The interiors of walls were often built with less care, using rougher, poorer-quality stones. To build structures above ground level, the workers used construction ramps built of varying materials such as mud, brick, or rough stone. When cutting chambers in living rock, workers excavated from the top down, carving a crawlspace near the ceiling and cutting down to the floor. Once the temple structure was complete, the rough faces of the stones were dressed to create a smooth surface. In decorating these surfaces, reliefs were carved into the stone or, if the stone was of too poor quality to carve, a layer of plaster that covered the stone surface. Reliefs were then decorated with gilding, inlay, or paint. The paints were usually mixtures of mineral pigments with some kind of adhesive, possibly natural gum.

Temple construction did not end once the original plan was complete; pharaohs often rebuilt or replaced decayed temple structures or made additions to those still standing. In the course of these additions, they frequently dismantled old temple buildings to use as fill for the interiors of new structures. On rare occasions, this may have been because the old structures or their builders had become anathema, as with Akhenaten's temples, but in most cases, the reason seems to have been convenience. Such expansion and dismantling could considerably distort the original temple plan, as happened at the enormous Precinct of Amun-Re at Karnak, which developed two intersecting axes and several satellite temples.

== Design and decoration ==
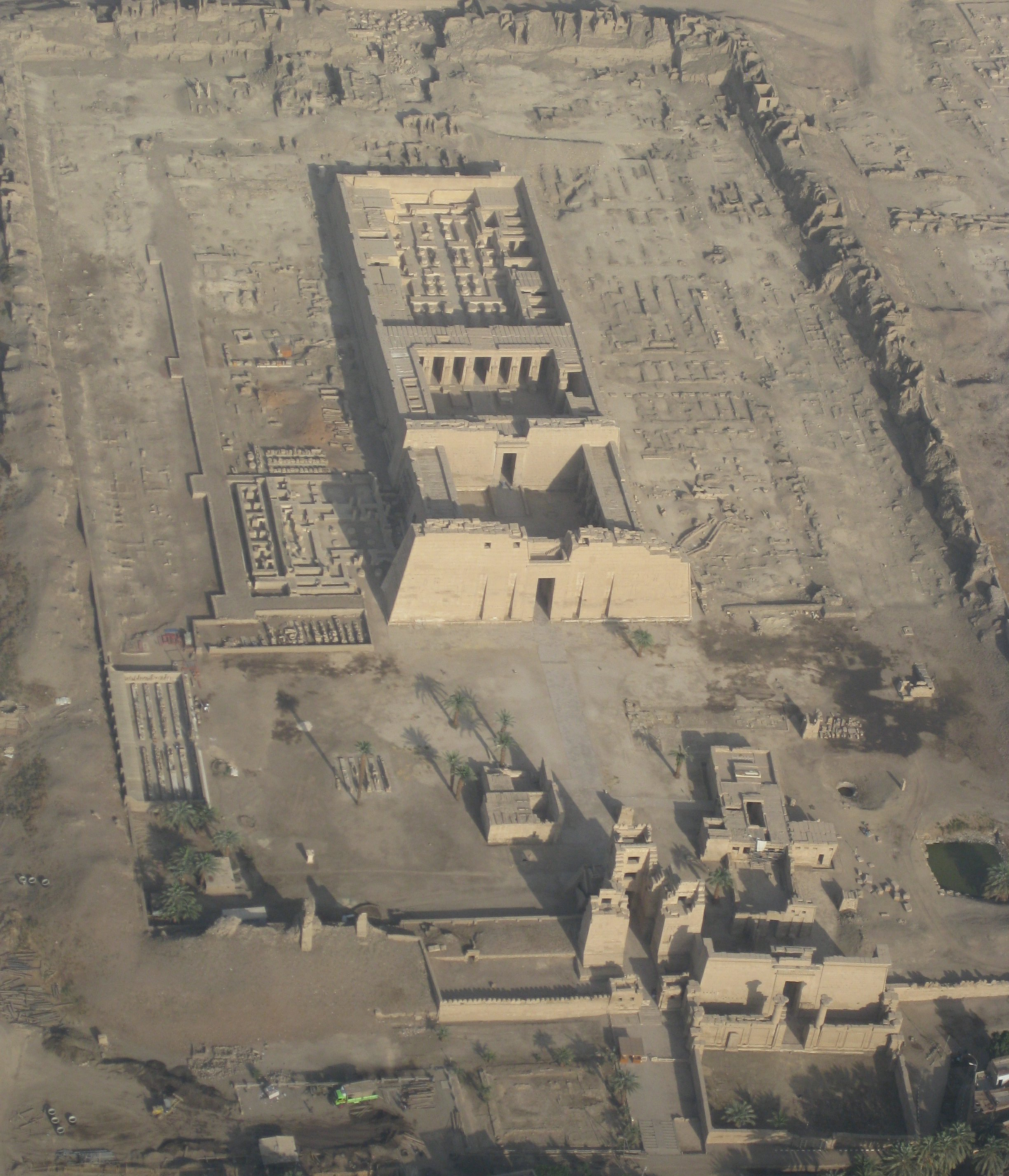
The temple of Ramesses III at Medinet Habu, surrounded by the remains of subsidiary structures. Twelfth century BC.

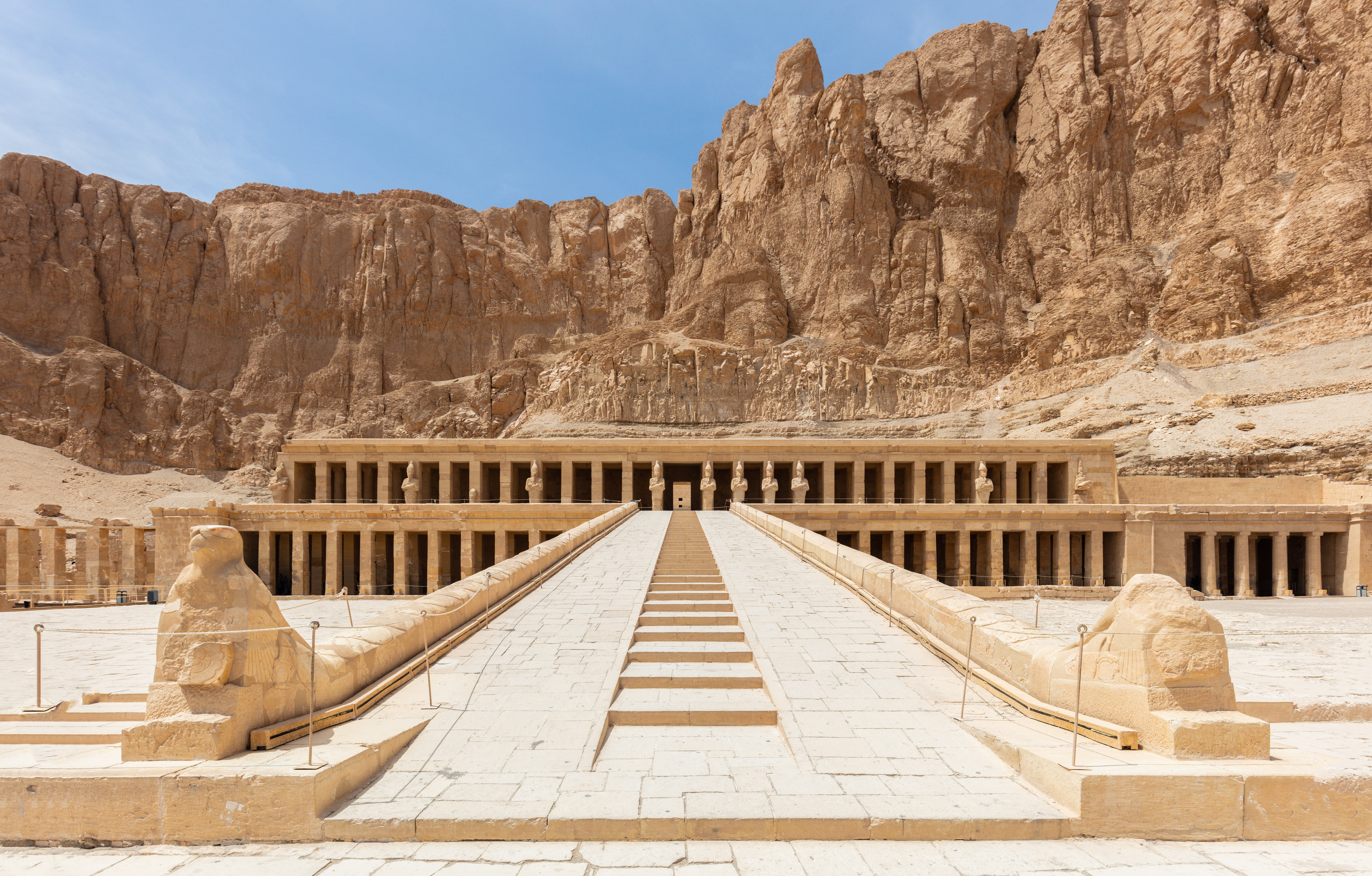
Processional ramp on the middle terrace leading up upper terrace at the mortuary temple of Hatshepsut at Deir el-Bahari. Fifteenth century BC.

Like all ancient Egyptian architecture, Egyptian temple designs emphasized order, symmetry, and monumentality and combined geometric shapes with stylized organic motifs. Elements of temple design also alluded to the form of the earliest Egyptian buildings. Cavetto cornices at the tops of walls, for instance, were made to imitate rows of palm fronds placed atop archaic walls, while the torus molding along the edges of walls may have been based on wooden posts used in such buildings. The batter of exterior walls, while partly meant to ensure stability, was also a holdover from archaic building methods. Temple ground plans usually centered on an axis running on a slight incline from the sanctuary down to the temple entrance. In the fully developed pattern used in the New Kingdom and later, the path used for festival processions—a broad avenue punctuated with large doors—served as this central axis. The path was intended primarily for the god's use when it traveled outside the sanctuary; on most occasions people used smaller side doors. The typical parts of a temple, such as column-filled hypostyle halls, open peristyle courts, and towering entrance pylons, were arranged along this path in a traditional but flexible order. Beyond the temple building proper, the outer walls enclosed numerous satellite buildings. The entire area enclosed by these walls is sometimes called the temenos, the sacred precinct dedicated to the god.

The temple pattern could vary considerably, apart from the distorting effect of additional construction. Many temples, known as hypogea, were cut entirely into living rock, as at Abu Simbel, or had rock-cut inner chambers with masonry courtyards and pylons, as at Wadi es-Sebua. They used much the same layout as free-standing temples but used excavated chambers rather than buildings as their inner rooms. In some temples, like the mortuary temples of Mentuhotep II and Hatshepsut at Deir el-Bahari, the processional path ran up a series of terraces rather than sitting on a single level. The Ptolemaic Temple of Kom Ombo was built with two main sanctuaries, producing two parallel axes that run the length of the building. The most idiosyncratic temple style was that of the Aten temples built by Akhenaten at Akhetaten, in which the axis passed through a series of entirely open courts filled with altars.

The traditional design was a highly symbolic variety of sacred architecture. It was a greatly elaborated variant on the design of an Egyptian house, reflecting its role as the god's home. Moreover, the temple represented a piece of the divine realm on earth. The elevated, enclosed sanctuary was equated with the sacred hill where the world was created in Egyptian myth and with the burial chamber of a tomb, where the god's ba, or spirit, came to inhabit its cult image just as a human ba came to inhabit its mummy. This crucial place, the Egyptians believed, had to be insulated from the impure outside world. Therefore, as one moved toward the sanctuary the amount of outside light decreased and restrictions on who could enter increased. Yet the temple could also represent the world itself. The processional way could, therefore, stand for the path of the sun traveling across the sky, and the sanctuary for the Duat where it was believed to set and to be reborn at night. The space outside the building was thus equated with the waters of chaos that lay outside the world, while the temple represented the order of the cosmos and the place where that order was continually renewed.

=== Inner chambers ===
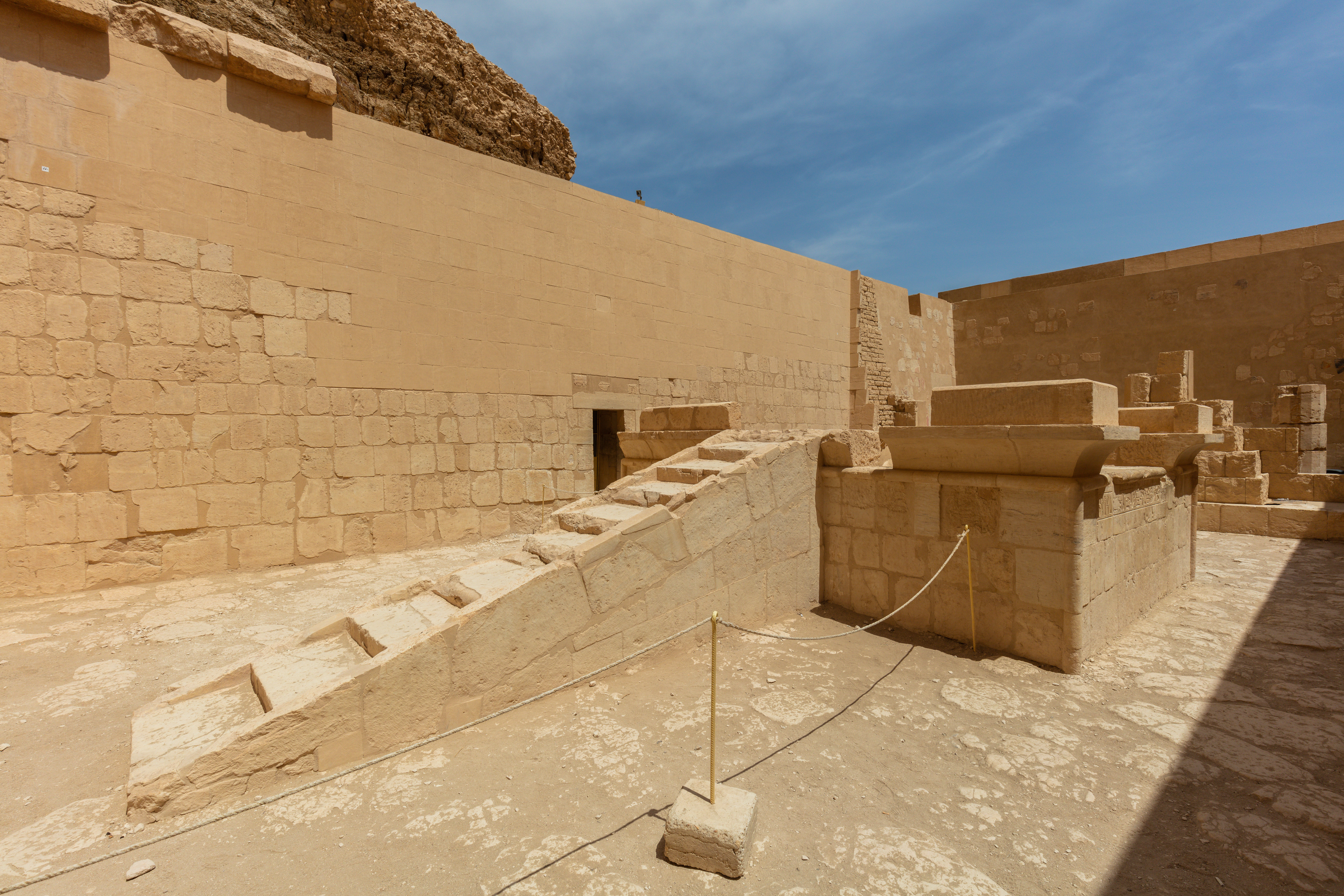
Sun chapel and altar in the mortuary temple of Hatshepsut

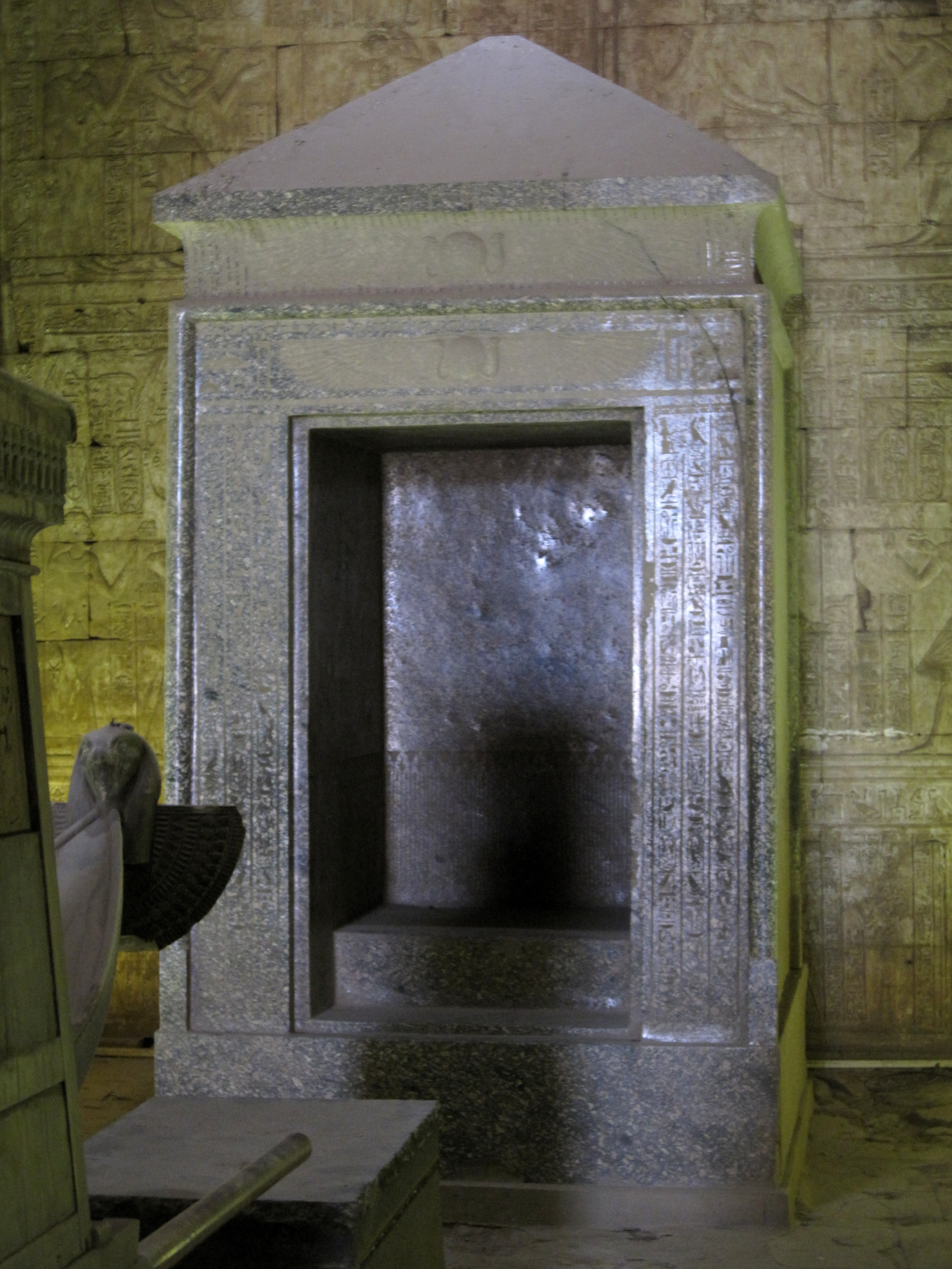
Shrine in the cella of the Temple of Edfu. Fourth to third century BC

The temple's inner chambers centered on the sanctuary of the temple's primary god, which typically lay along the axis near the back of the temple building, and in pyramid temples directly against the pyramid base. The sanctuary was the focus of temple ritual, the place where the divine presence manifested most strongly. The form in which it manifested itself varied. In Aten temples and traditional solar shrines, the object of ritual was the sun itself or a benben stone representing the sun, worshipped in a court open to the sky. In many mortuary temples, the inner areas contained statues of the deceased pharaoh, or a false door where his ba ("personality") was believed to appear to receive offerings.

In most temples, the focus was the cult image: a statue of the temple god which that god's ba was believed to inhabit while interacting with humans. (Note: No surviving statues of deities are known for certain to have been cult images, although a few have the right characteristics to have served that purpose.) The sanctuary in these temples contained either a naos, a cabinet-like shrine that housed the divine image, or a model barque containing the image within its cabin, which was used to carry the image during festival processions. In some cases the sanctuary may have housed several cult statues. To emphasize the sanctuary's sacred nature, it was kept in total darkness. Whereas in earlier times the sanctuary lay at the very back of the building, in the Late and Ptolemaic periods it became a freestanding building inside the temple, further insulated from the outside world by the surrounding corridors and rooms.

Subsidiary chapels, dedicated to deities associated with the primary god, lay to the sides of the main one. When the main temple god was male, the secondary chapels were often dedicated to that god's mythological consort and child. The secondary chapels in mortuary temples were devoted to gods associated with kingship.

Several other rooms neighbored the sanctuary. Many of these rooms were used to store ceremonial equipment, ritual texts, or temple valuables; others had specific ritual functions. The room where offerings were given to the deity was often separate from the sanctuary itself, and in temples without a barque in the sanctuary, there was a separate shrine to store the barque. In late temples the ritual areas could extend to chapels on the roof and crypts below the floor. Finally, in the exterior wall at the back of the temple, there were often niches for laymen to pray to the temple god, as close as they could come to its dwelling place.

=== Halls and courts ===
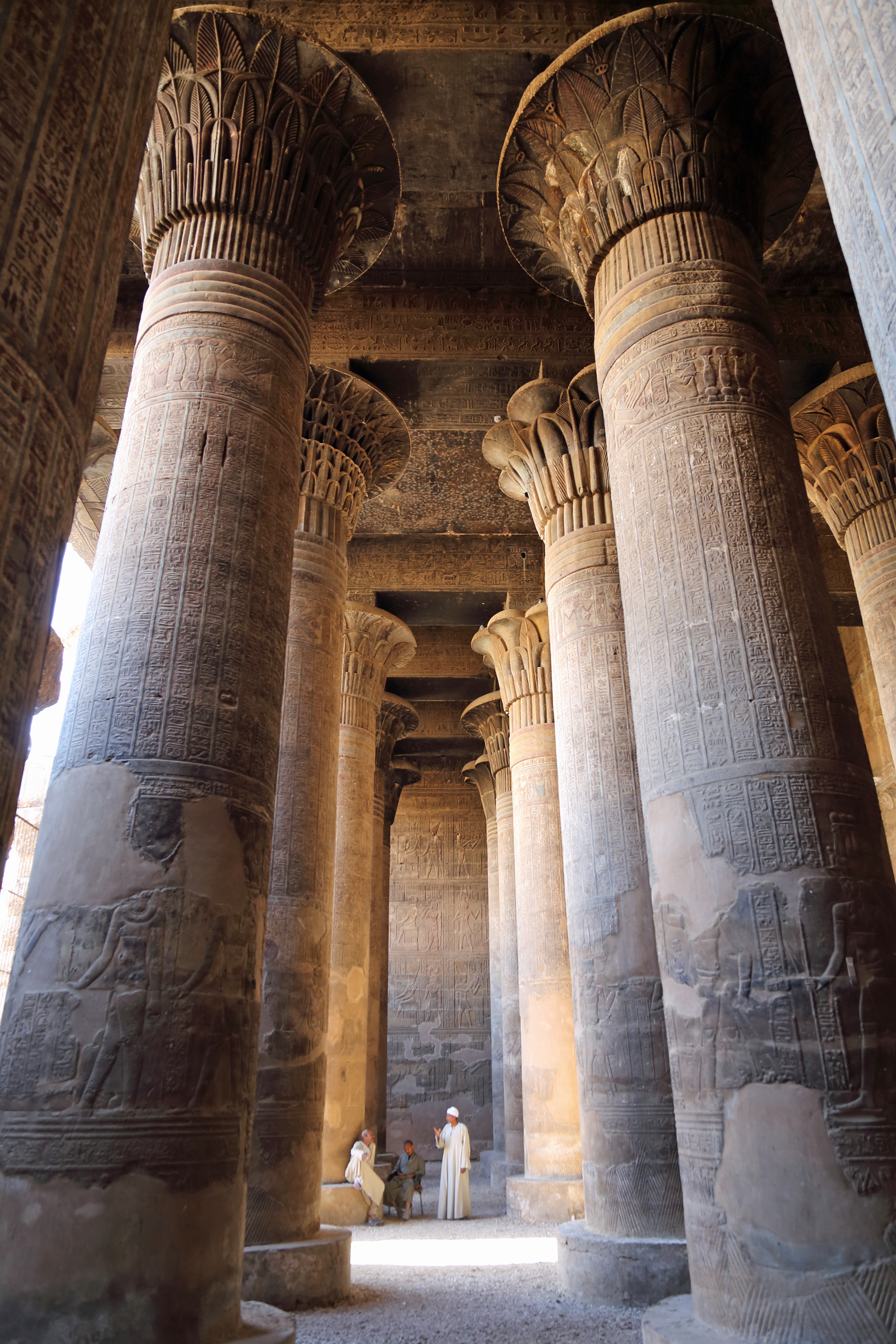
Hypostyle hall of Esna Temple. First century AD.

Hypostyle halls, covered rooms filled with columns, appear in temples throughout Egyptian history. By the New Kingdom they typically lay directly in front of the sanctuary area. These halls were less restricted than the inner rooms, being open to laymen at least in some cases. They were often less dark as well: New Kingdom halls rose into tall central passages over the processional path, allowing a clerestory to provide dim light. The epitome of this style is the Great Hypostyle Hall at Karnak, whose largest columns are 69 feet (21 m) tall. In later periods, the Egyptians favored a different style of hall, where a low screen wall at the front let in the light. The shadowy halls, whose columns were often shaped to imitate plants such as lotus or papyrus, were symbolic of the mythological marsh that surrounded the primeval mound at the time of creation. The columns could also be equated with the pillars that held up the sky in Egyptian cosmology.

Beyond the hypostyle hall were one or more peristyle courts open to the sky. These open courts, which had been a part of Egyptian temple design since the Old Kingdom, became transitional areas in the standard plan of the New Kingdom, lying between the public space outside the temple and the more restricted areas within. Here the public met with the priests and assembled during festivals. At the front of each court was usually a pylon, a pair of trapezoidal towers flanking the main gateway. The pylon is known from only scattered examples in the Old and Middle Kingdoms, but in the New Kingdom it quickly became the distinctive and imposing façade common to most Egyptian temples. The pylon served symbolically as a guard tower against the forces of disorder and may also have been meant to resemble Akhet, the hieroglyph for "horizon", underscoring the temple's solar symbolism.

The front of every pylon held niches for pairs of flagpoles to stand. Unlike pylons, such flags had stood at temple entrances since the earliest Predynastic shrines. They were so closely associated with the presence of a deity that the hieroglyph for them came to stand for the Egyptian word for "god".

=== Enclosure ===
Outside the temple building proper was the temple enclosure, surrounded by a rectangular brick wall that symbolically protected the sacred space from outside disorder. On occasion, this function was more than symbolic, especially during the last native dynasties in the fourth century BC, when the walls were fully fortified in case of invasion by the Achaemenid Empire. In late temples, these walls frequently had alternating concave and convex courses of bricks, so that the top of the wall undulated vertically. This pattern may have been meant to evoke the mythological waters of chaos.

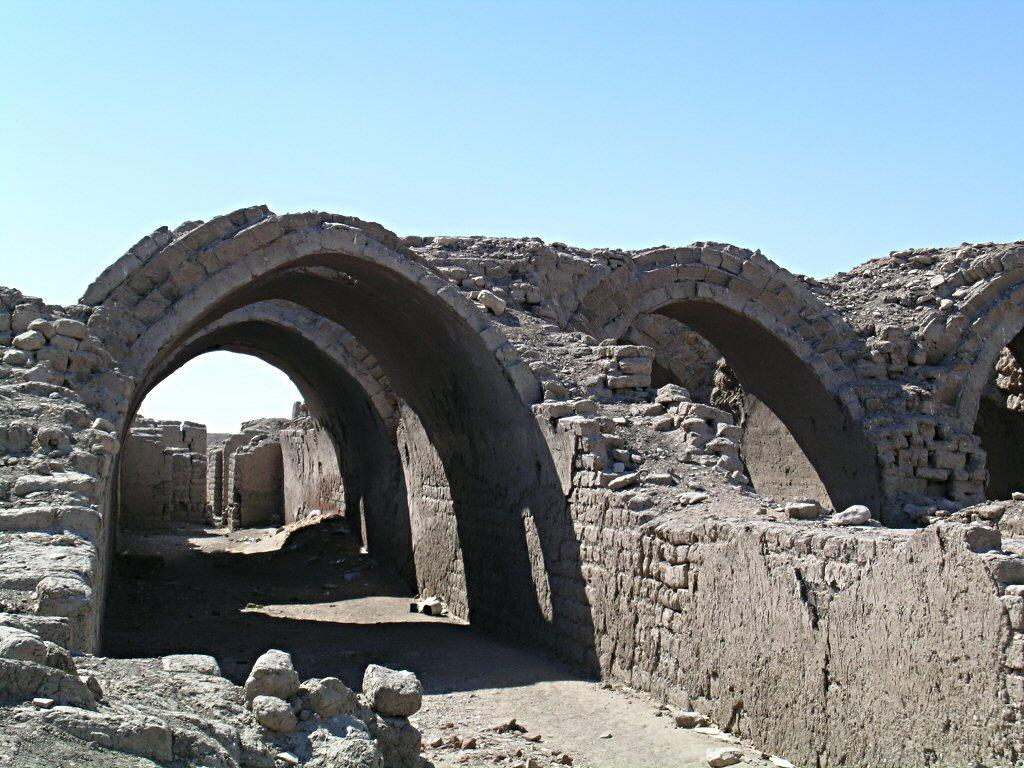
Brick storehouses at the Ramesseum. Thirteenth century BC.

The walls enclosed many buildings related to the temple's function. Some enclosures contain satellite chapels dedicated to deities associated with the temple god, including mammisis celebrating the birth of the god's mythological child. Sacred lakes found in many temple enclosures served as reservoirs for the water used in rituals, as places for the priests to ritually cleanse themselves and as representations of the water from which the world emerged.

Mortuary temples sometimes contain a palace for the spirit of the king to whom the temple was dedicated, built against the temple building proper. The Mortuary Temple of Seti I at Abydos incorporates an unusual underground structure, the Osireion, which may have served as a symbolic tomb for the king. Sanatoria in some temples provided a place for the sick to await healing dreams sent by the god. Other temple buildings included kitchens, workshops, and storehouses to supply the temple's needs.

Especially important was the pr ꜥnḫ "house of life", where the temple edited, copied, and stored its religious texts, including those used for temple rituals. The house of life also functioned as a general center of learning, containing works on non-religious subjects such as history, geography, astronomy, and medicine. Although these outlying buildings were devoted to more mundane purposes than the temple itself, they still had religious significance; even granaries might be used for specific ceremonies.

Through the enclosure ran the processional path, which led from the temple entrance through the main gate in the enclosure wall. The path was frequently decorated with sphinx statues and punctuated by barque stations, where the priests carrying the festival barque could set it down to rest during the procession. The processional path usually ended in a quay on the Nile, which served as the entrance point for river-borne visitors and the exit point for the festival procession when it traveled by water. In Old Kingdom pyramid temples, the quay adjoined an entire temple (the valley temple), which was linked to the pyramid temple by the processional causeway.

=== Decoration ===
The temple building was elaborately decorated with reliefs and free-standing sculpture, all with religious significance. As with the cult statue, the gods were believed to be present in these images, suffusing the temple with sacred power. Symbols of places in Egypt or parts of the cosmos enhanced the mythical geography already present in the temple's architecture. Images of rituals served to reinforce the rituals' magical effect and to perpetuate that effect even if the rituals ceased to be performed. Because of their religious nature, these decorations showed an idealized version of reality, emblematic of the temple's purpose rather than real events. For instance, the king was shown performing most rituals, while priests, if depicted, were secondary. It was unimportant that he was rarely present for these ceremonies; it was his role as an intermediary with the gods that mattered.

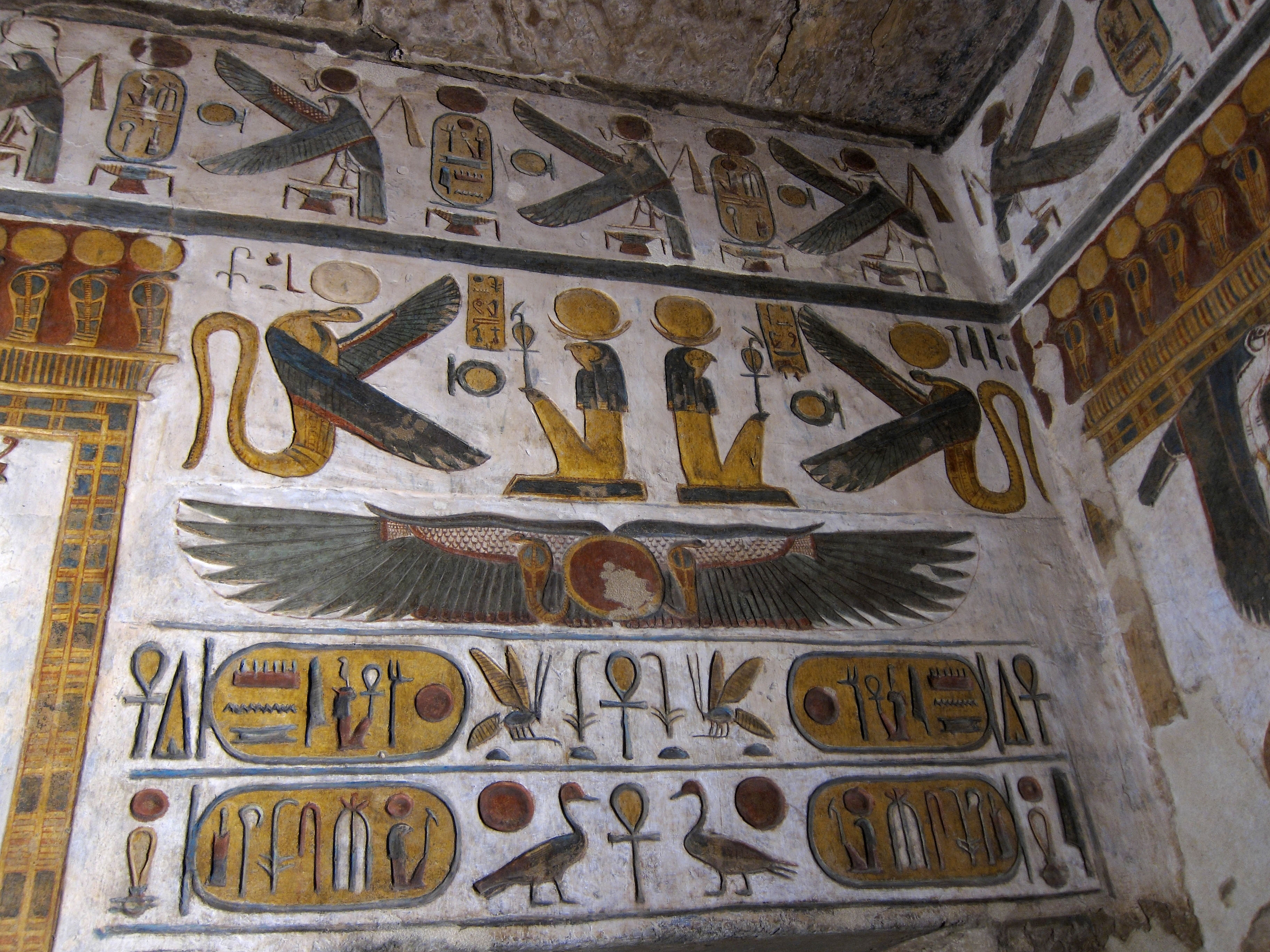
Painted relief in the Temple of Khonsu at Karnak. Twelfth century BC

The most important form of decoration was relief. Relief became more extensive over time, and in late temples, walls, ceilings, columns, and beams were all decorated, as were free-standing stelae erected within the enclosure. Egyptian artists used both low relief and sunken relief. Low relief allowed more subtle artistry but involved more carving than sunken relief. Sunken relief was therefore used on harder, more difficult stone and when the builders wanted to finish quickly. It was also appropriate for exterior surfaces, where the shadows it created made the figures stand out in bright sunlight. Finished reliefs were painted using the basic colors black, white, red, yellow, green, and blue, although the artists often mixed pigments to create other colors, and Ptolemaic temples were especially varied, using unusual colors such as purple as accents. In some temples, gilding or inlaid pieces of colored glass or faience substituted for paint.

Temple decoration is among the most important sources of information on ancient Egypt. It includes calendars of festivals, accounts of myths, depictions of rituals, and the texts of hymns. Pharaohs recorded their temple-building activities and their campaigns against the enemies of Egypt. The Ptolemaic temples go further to include information of all kinds taken from temple libraries. The decoration in a given room either depicts the actions performed there or has some symbolic tie to the room's purpose, providing a great deal of information on temple activities. Interior walls were divided into several registers. The lowest registers were decorated with plants representing the primeval marsh, while the ceilings and tops of walls were decorated with stars and flying birds to represent the sky. Illustrations of rituals, surrounded by text related to the rituals, often filled the middle and upper registers. Courts and exterior walls often recorded the king's military exploits. The pylon showed the "smiting scene", a motif in which the king strikes down his enemies, symbolizing the defeat of the forces of chaos.

The text on the walls was the formal hieroglyphic script. Some texts were written in a "cryptographic" form, using symbols in a different way than the normal conventions of hieroglyphic writing. The cryptographic text became more widespread and more complex in Ptolemaic times. Temple walls also frequently bear written or drawn graffiti, both in modern languages and in ancient ones such as Greek, Latin, and Demotic, the form of Egyptian that was commonly used in Greco-Roman times. Although not part of the temple's formal decoration, graffiti can be an important source of information about its history, both when its cults were functioning and after its abandonment. Ancient graffiti, for instance, often mention the names and titles of priests who worked in the temple, and modern travelers often inscribed their names in temples that they visited. Graffiti left by priests and pilgrims at Philae include the last ancient hieroglyphic text, inscribed in AD 394, and the last one in Demotic script, from AD 452.

Large, free-standing sculpture included obelisks, tall, pointed pillars that symbolized the sun. The largest, the Lateran Obelisk, was more than 118 feet (36 m) high. They were often placed in pairs in front of pylons or elsewhere along the temple axis. Statues of the king, which were similarly placed, also reached colossal size; the Colossi of Memnon at the mortuary temple of Amenhotep III and the statue of Ramesses II at the Ramesseum are the largest free-standing statues made in ancient Egypt. There were also figures of gods, often in sphinx form, that served as symbolic guardians of the temple. The most numerous statues were votive figures donated to the temple by kings, private individuals, or even towns to gain divine favor. They could depict the god to whom they were dedicated, the people who donated the statue, or both. The most essential temple statues were the cult images, which were usually made of or decorated with precious materials such as gold and lapis lazuli.

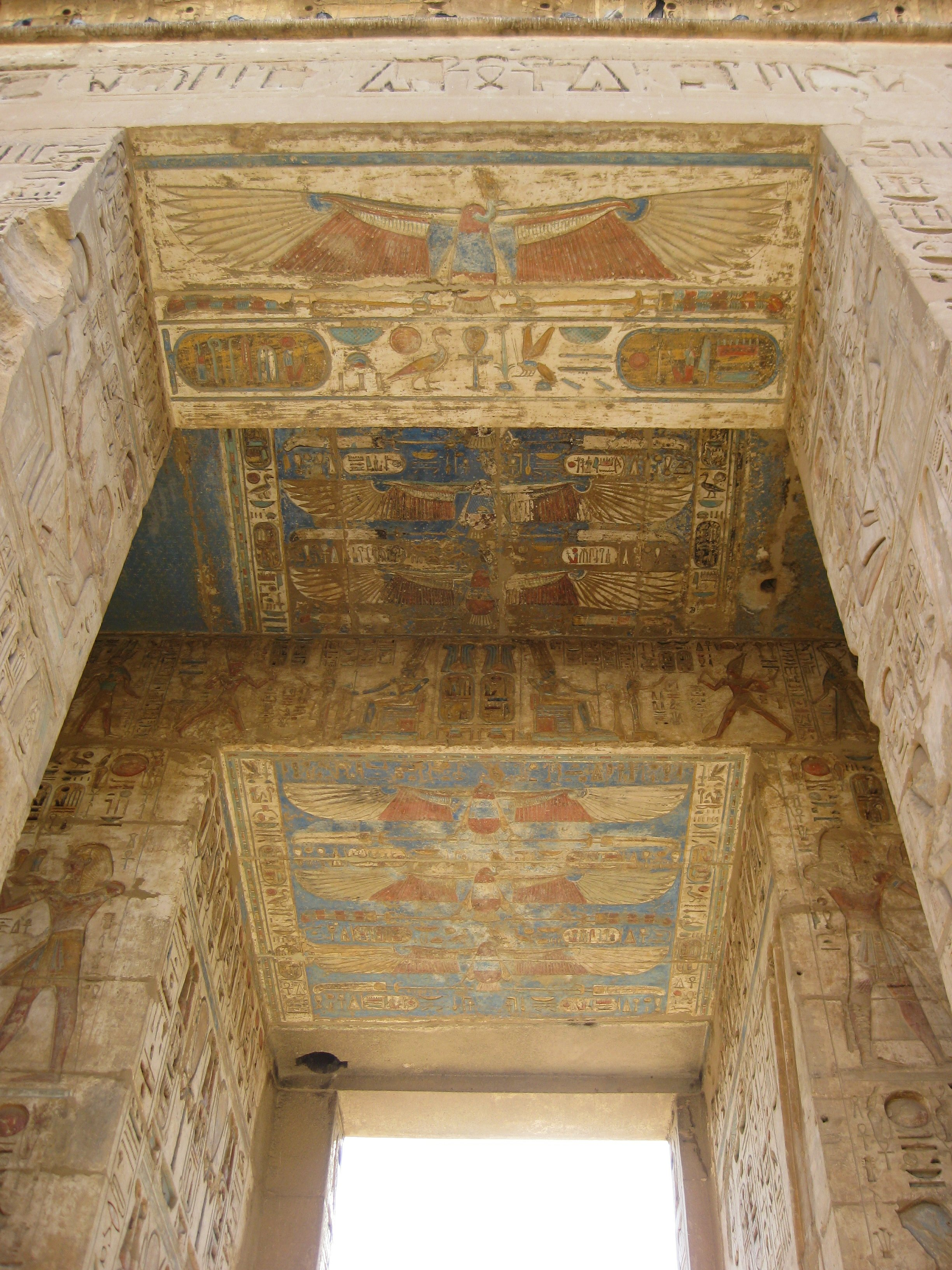
Painted relief on doorframes and ceilings at Medinet Habu. Twelfth century BC.

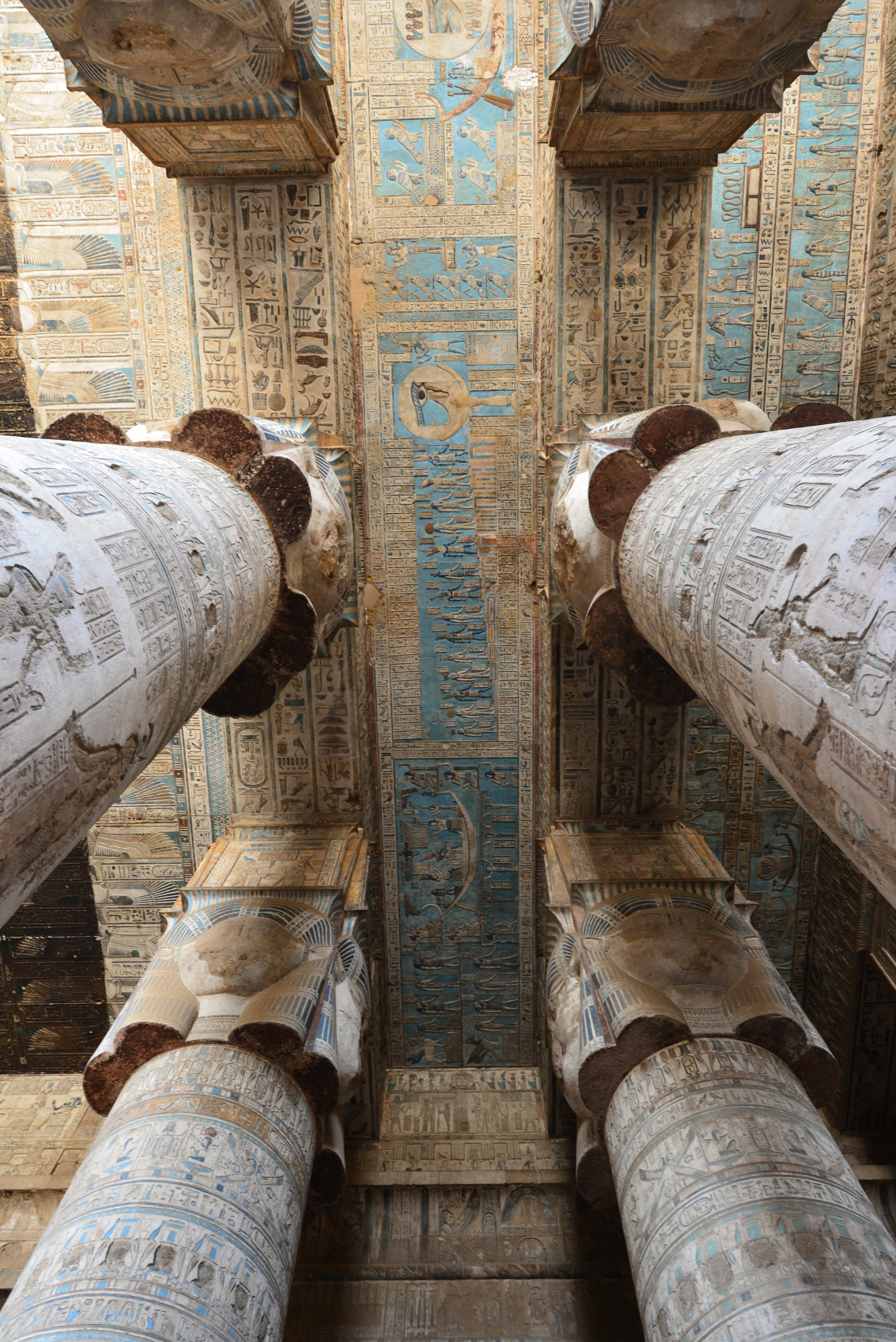
Painted relief on columns, beams, and ceilings at Dendera Temple. First to second century AD.

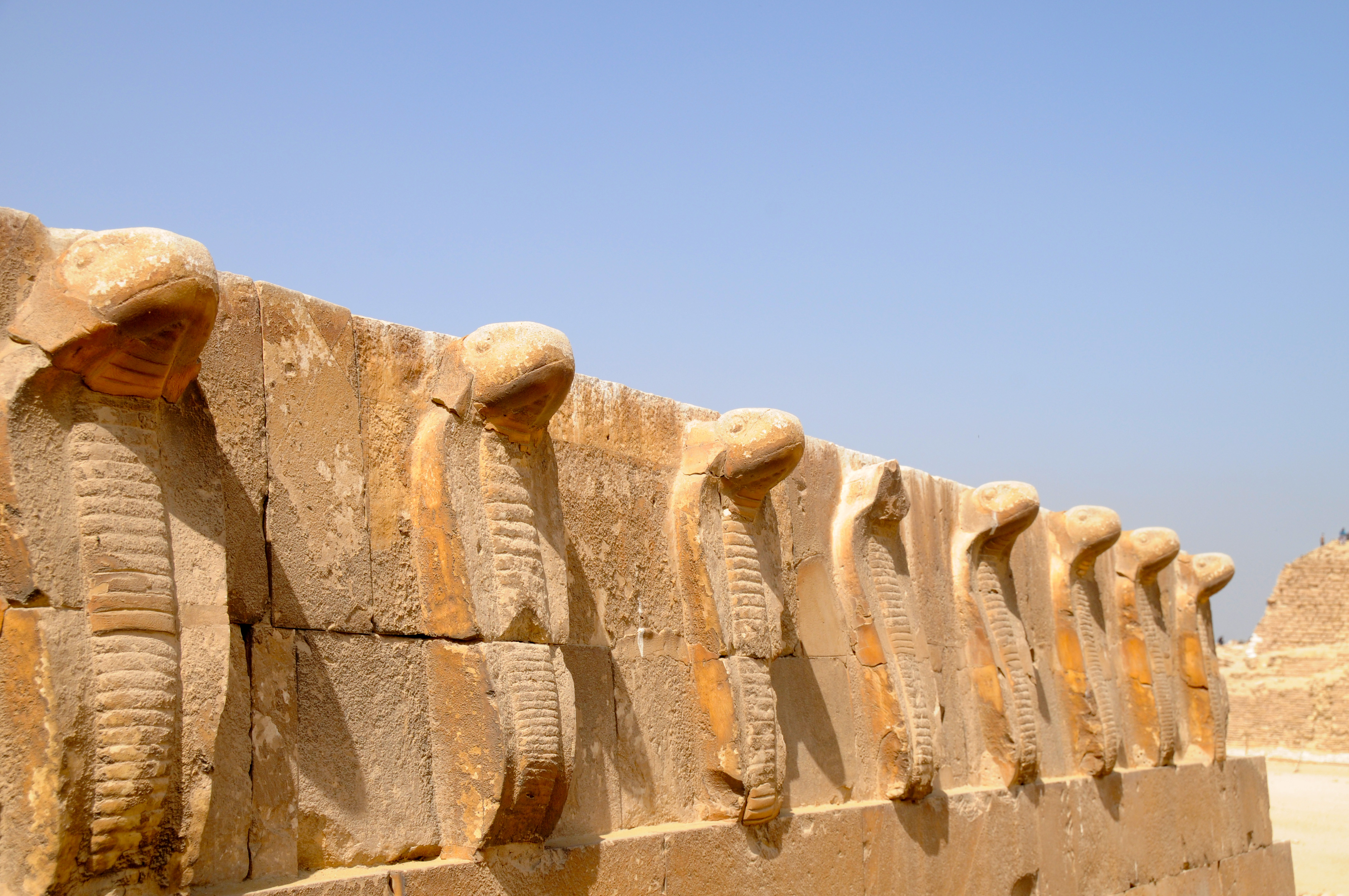
Frieze of sculpted uraei, or rearing cobras, atop a wall at the pyramid complex of Djoser. Twenty-eighth century BC.

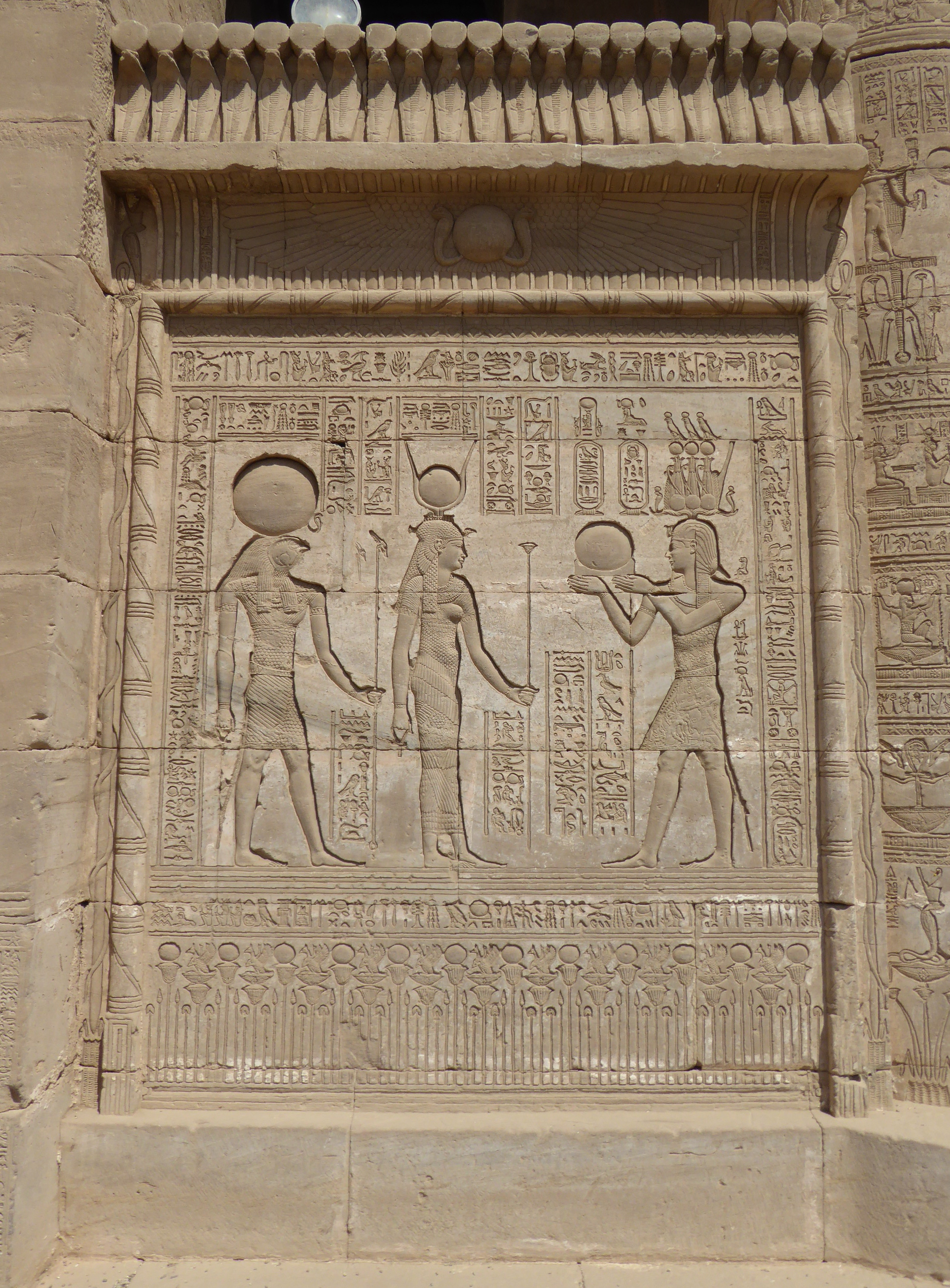
Relief on a screen wall between columns at Dendera, with images of marsh plants at the base, torus moldings framing the relief, and a cavetto cornice with a winged sun emblem topped by a frieze of uraei. First to second century AD.

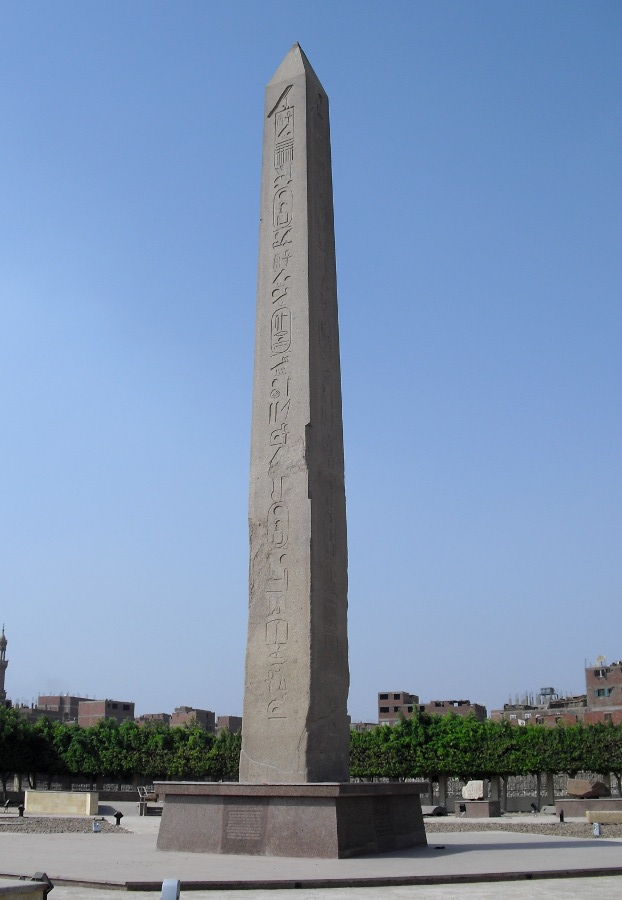
Obelisk of Senusret I at Heliopolis. Twentieth century BC.

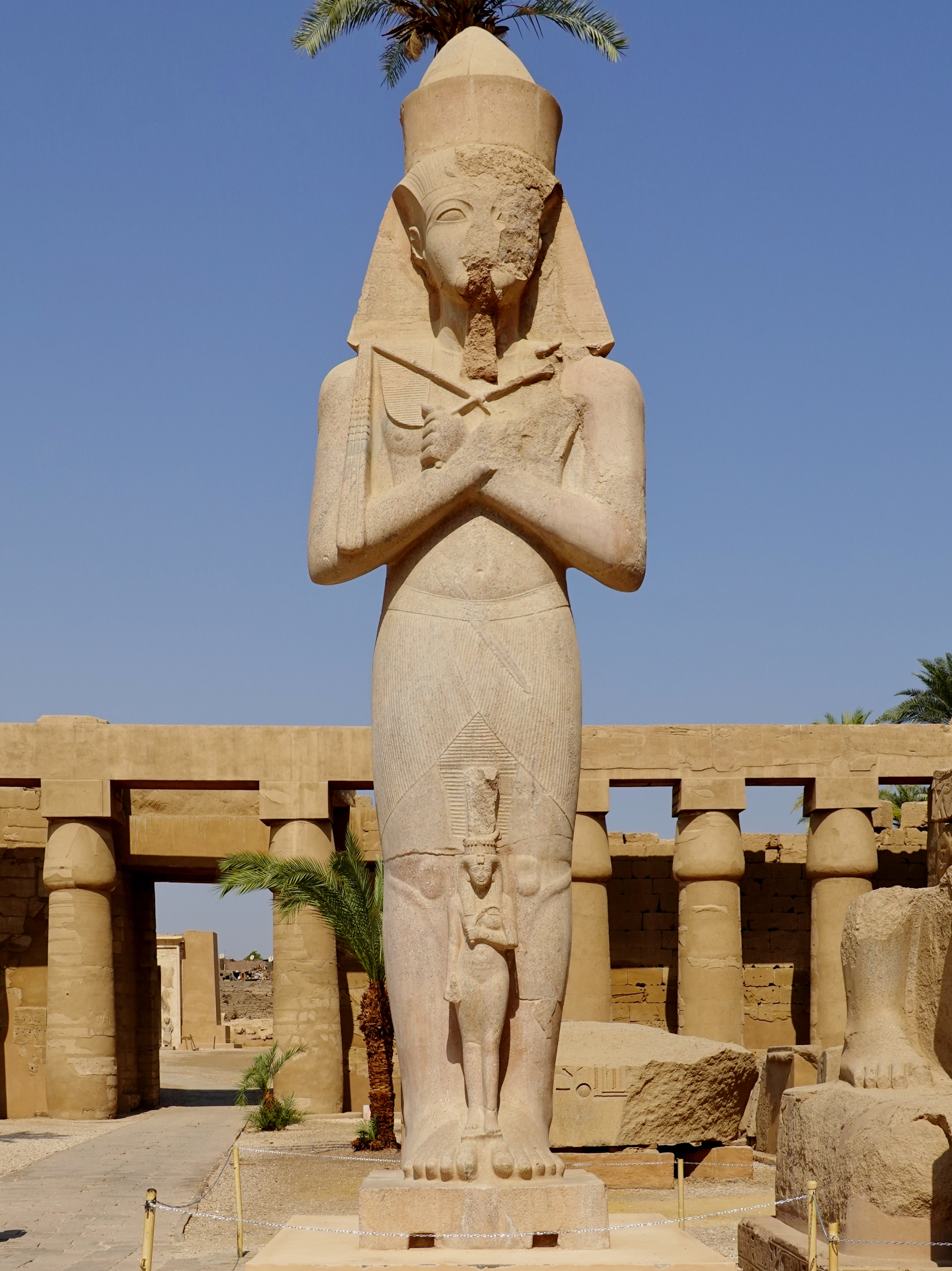
Statue of Pinedjem I, the High Priest of Amun at Karnak, as a pharaoh. Eleventh century BC.

== Personnel ==
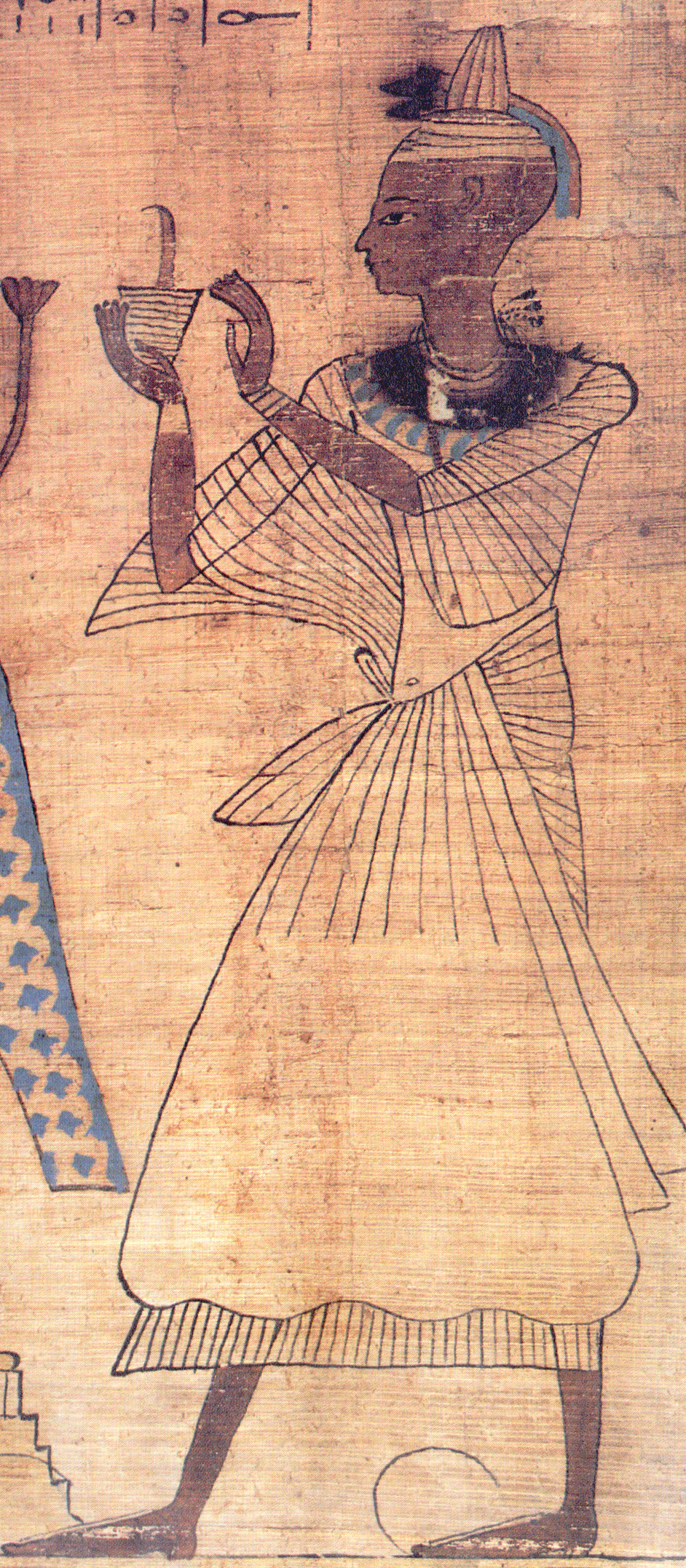
A priest burning incense depicted in a papyrus. Tenth century BC.

A temple needed many people to perform its rituals and support duties. Priests performed the temple's essential ritual functions, but in Egyptian religious ideology, they were far less important than the king. All ceremonies were, in theory, acts by the king, and priests merely stood in his place. The priests were therefore subject to the king's authority, and he had the right to appoint anyone he wished to the priesthood. In fact, in the Old and Middle Kingdoms, most priests were government officials who left their secular duties for part of the year to serve the temple in shifts. Once the priesthood became more professional, the king seems to have used his power over appointments mainly for the highest-ranking positions, usually to reward a favorite official with a job or to intervene for political reasons in the affairs of an important cult. Lesser appointments he delegated to his vizier or to the priests themselves. In the latter case, the holder of an office named his own son as his successor, or the temple clergy conferred to decide who should fill an empty post. Priestly offices were extremely lucrative and tended to be held by the wealthiest and most influential members of Egyptian society. In the Greco-Roman period, priestly offices continued to be advantageous. Especially in rural areas, Egyptian priests distinguished themselves from other inhabitants by means of income and privileges attached to priestly offices, but also by their education in reading and writing. High-ranking offices were, still, so lucrative that some priests fought over their occupation in lengthy court cases. However, that may have changed in the later Roman period, when Egypt was subject to large-scale processes of economic, social, cultural and religious change.

The requirements for the priesthood differed over time and among the cults of different gods. Although detailed knowledge was involved in priestly offices, little is known about what knowledge or training may have been required of the officeholders. Priests were required to observe strict standards of ritual purity before entering the most sacred areas. They shaved their heads and bodies, washed several times a day, and wore only clean linen clothing. They were not required to be celibate, but sexual intercourse rendered them unclean until they underwent further purification. The cults of specific gods might impose further restrictions related to that god's mythology, such as rules against eating the meat of an animal that represented the god. The acceptance of women into the priesthood was variable. In the Old Kingdom, many women served as priests, but their presence in clergies declined drastically in the Middle Kingdom before increasing in the Third Intermediate Period. Lesser positions, such as that of a musician in ceremonies, remained open to women in even the most restrictive periods, as did the special role of a ceremonial consort of the god. This latter role was highly influential, and the most important of these consorts, the God's Wife of Amun, even supplanted the High Priest of Amun during the Late Period.

At the head of the temple hierarchy was the high priest, who oversaw all the temple's religious and economic functions and in the largest cults was an important political figure. Beneath him might be as many as three grades of subordinate priests who could substitute for him in ceremonies. While these higher ranks were full-time positions from the New Kingdom onward, the lower grades of priesthood still worked in shifts over the course of the year. Whereas many priests did a variety of menial tasks, the clergy also contained several ritual specialists. Prominent among these specialized roles was that of the lector priest who recited hymns and spells during temple rituals, and who hired out his magical services to laymen. Besides its priests, a large temple employed singers, musicians, and dancers to perform during rituals, plus the farmers, bakers, artisans, builders, and administrators who supplied and managed its practical needs. In the Ptolemaic era, temples could also house people who had sought asylum within the precinct, or recluses who voluntarily dedicated themselves to serving the god and living in its household. A major cult, therefore, could have well over 150 full or part-time priests, with tens of thousands of non-priestly employees working on its lands across the country. These numbers contrast with mid-sized temples, which may have had 10 to 25 priests, and with the smallest provincial temples, which might have only one.

Some priests' duties took them beyond the temple precinct. They formed part of the entourage in festivals that traveled from one temple to another, and clergies from around the country sent representatives to the national Sed festival that reinforced the king's divine power. Some temples, such as those in the neighboring cities of Memphis and Letopolis, were overseen by the same high priest.

At certain times there was an administrative office that presided over all temples and clergies. In the Old Kingdom, kings gave this authority first to their relatives and then to their viziers. In the reign of Thutmose III the office passed from the viziers to the High Priests of Amun, who held it for much of the New Kingdom. The Romans established a similar office, that of the high priest for all Egypt, which oversaw the temple cults until their extinction.

== Religious activities ==
=== Daily rituals ===
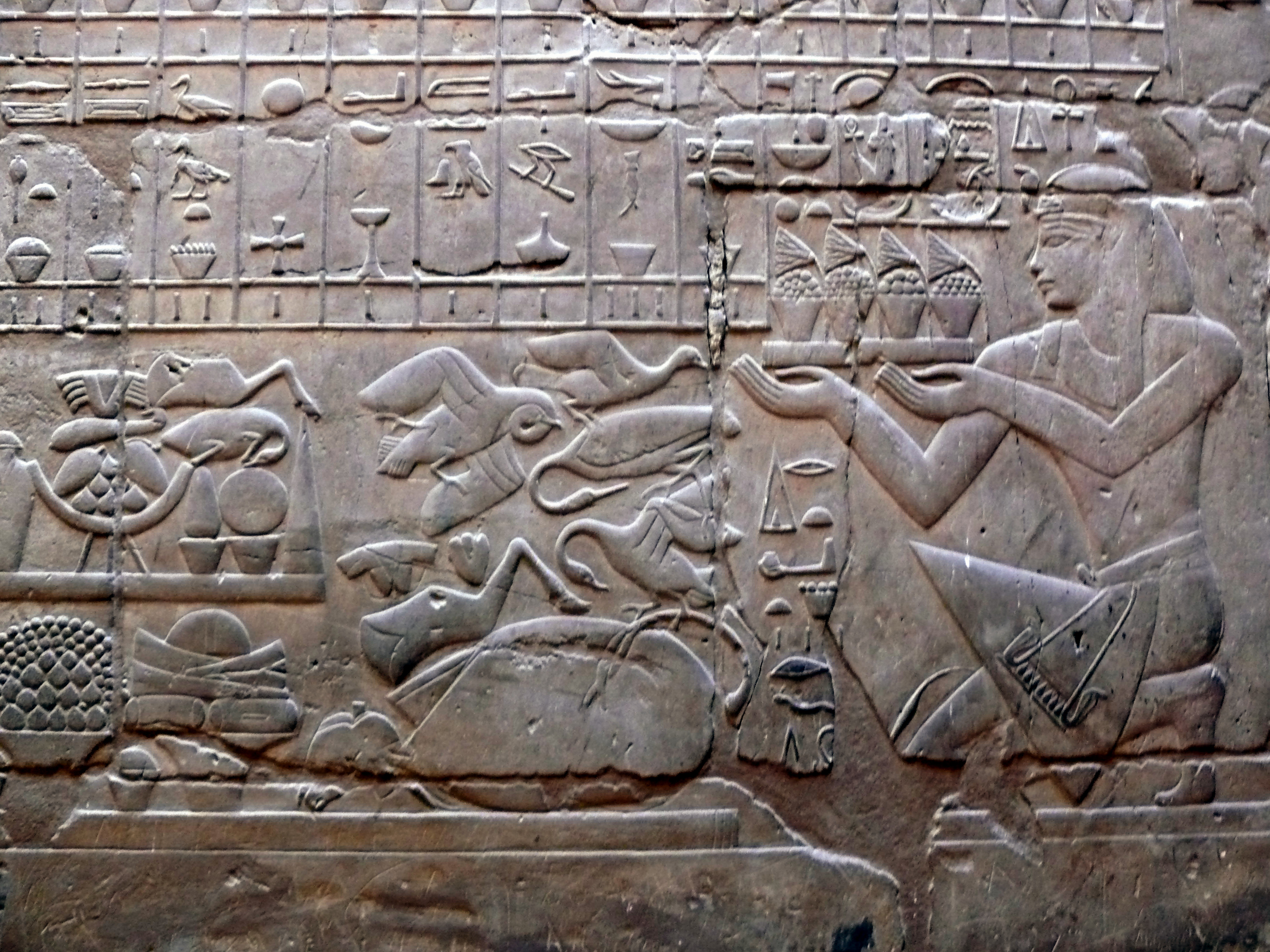
Amenhotep III presents a variety of offerings in a relief from Luxor Temple. Fourteenth century BC.

The daily rituals in most temples included two sequences of offering rites: one to clean and dress the god for the day, and one to present it with a meal. The exact order of events in these rituals is uncertain and may have varied somewhat each time they were performed. In addition, the two sequences probably overlapped with each other. At sunrise, the officiating priest entered the sanctuary, carrying a candle to light the room. He opened the doors of the shrine and prostrated himself before the god's image, reciting hymns in its praise. He removed the god from the shrine, clothed it (replacing the clothes of the previous day), and anointed it with oil and paint. At some point the priest presented the god's meal, including a variety of meats, fruits, vegetables, and bread.

The god was believed to consume only the spiritual essence of this meal. This belief allowed the food to be distributed to others, an act that the Egyptians called the "reversion of offerings". The food passed first to the other statues throughout the temple, then to local funerary chapels for the sustenance of the dead, and finally to the priests who ate it. The quantities even for the daily meal were so large that only a small part of it can have been placed on the offering tables. Most of it must have gone directly to these secondary uses.

Temple artwork often shows the king presenting an image of the goddess Maat to the temple deity, an act that represented the purpose of all other offerings. The king may have presented a real figurine of Maat to the deity, or the temple reliefs depicting the act may have been purely symbolic.

Other offering rituals took place at noon and at sunset, though the sanctuary was not reopened. Some ceremonies other than offerings also took place daily, including rituals specific to a particular god. In the cult of the sun god Ra, for instance, hymns were sung day and night for every hour of the god's journey across the sky. Many of the ceremonies acted out in ritual the battle against of the forces of chaos. They might, for instance, involve the destruction of models of inimical gods like Apep or Set, acts that were believed to have a real effect through the principle of ḥkꜣ (Egyptological pronunciation heka) "magic".

In fact, the Egyptians believed that all ritual actions achieved their effect through ḥkꜣ. It was a fundamental force that rituals were meant to manipulate. Using magic, people, objects, and actions were equated with counterparts in the divine realm and thus were believed to affect events among the gods. In the daily offering, for instance, the cult statue, regardless of which deity it represented, was associated with Osiris, the god of the dead. The priest performing the ritual was identified with Horus, the living son of Osiris, who in mythology sustained his father after death through offerings. By magically equating himself with a god in a myth, the priest was able to interact with the temple deity.

=== Festivals ===
On days of particular religious significance, the daily rituals were replaced with festival observances. Different festivals occurred at different intervals, though most were annual. Their timing was based on the Egyptian civil calendar, which most of the time was far out of step with the astronomical year. Thus, while many festivals had a seasonal origin, their timing lost its connection with the seasons. Most festivals took place at a single temple, but others could involve two or more temples or an entire region of Egypt; a few were celebrated throughout the country. In the New Kingdom and later, the festival calendar at a single temple could include dozens of events, so it is likely that most of these events were observed only by the priests. In those festivals that involved a procession outside the temple, the local population also gathered to watch and to celebrate. These were the most elaborate temple ceremonies, accompanied by the recitation of hymns and the performance of musicians.

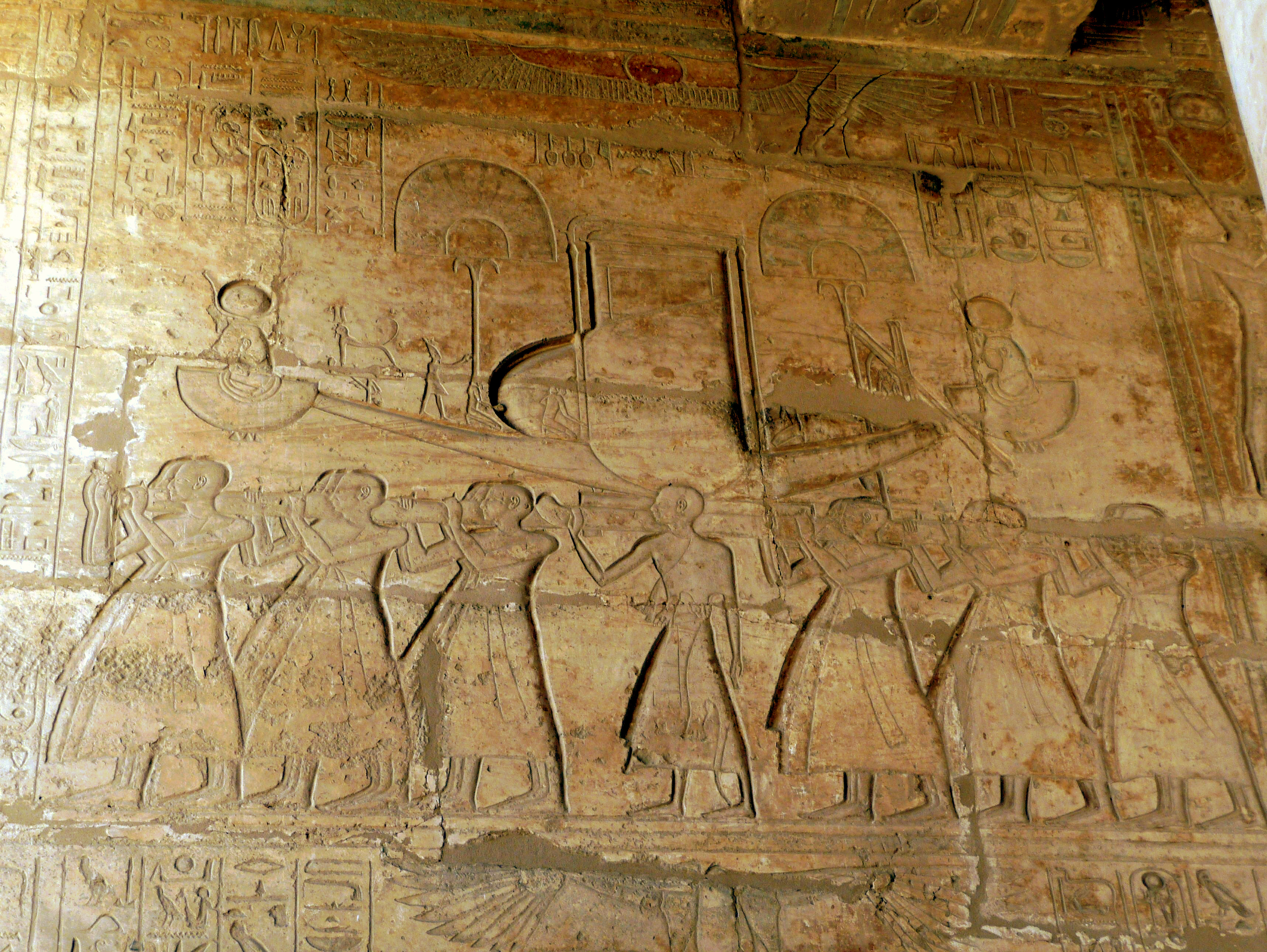
Priests carrying a festival barque in a relief from the Ramesseum. Thirteenth century BC.

Festival ceremonies entailed reenactment of mythological events or the performance of other symbolic acts, like the cutting of a sheaf of wheat during the harvest-related festival dedicated to the god Min. Many of these ceremonies took place only within the temple building, such as the "union with the sun disk" festival practiced in the Late Period and afterward, when cult statues were carried to the temple roof at the start of the New Year to be enlivened by the rays of the sun. In festivals that involved a procession, priests carried the divine image out from the sanctuary, usually in its model barque, to visit another site. The barque might travel entirely on land or be loaded onto a real boat to travel on the river.

The purpose of the god's visit varied. Some were tied to the ideology of kingship. In the Opet Festival, an extremely important ceremony during the New Kingdom, the image of Amun from Karnak visited the form of Amun worshipped at Luxor Temple, and both acted to reaffirm the king's divine rule. Still other celebrations had a funerary character, as in the Beautiful Festival of the Valley, when Amun of Karnak visited the mortuary temples of the Theban Necropolis to visit the kings commemorated there, while ordinary people visited the funerary chapels of their own deceased relatives. Some may have centered on ritual marriages between deities, or between deities and their human consorts, although the evidence that ritual marriage was their purpose is ambiguous. A prominent example is a festival in which an image of Hathor from the Dendera Temple complex was brought annually to visit the Temple of Edfu, the temple of her mythological consort Horus. These varied ceremonies were united by the broad purpose of renewing life among the gods and in the cosmos.

The gods involved in a festival also received offerings in much larger quantities than in daily ceremonies. The enormous amounts of food listed in festival texts are unlikely to have been divided among the priests alone, so it is likely that the celebrating commoners also participated in the reversion of these offerings.

=== Sacred animals ===
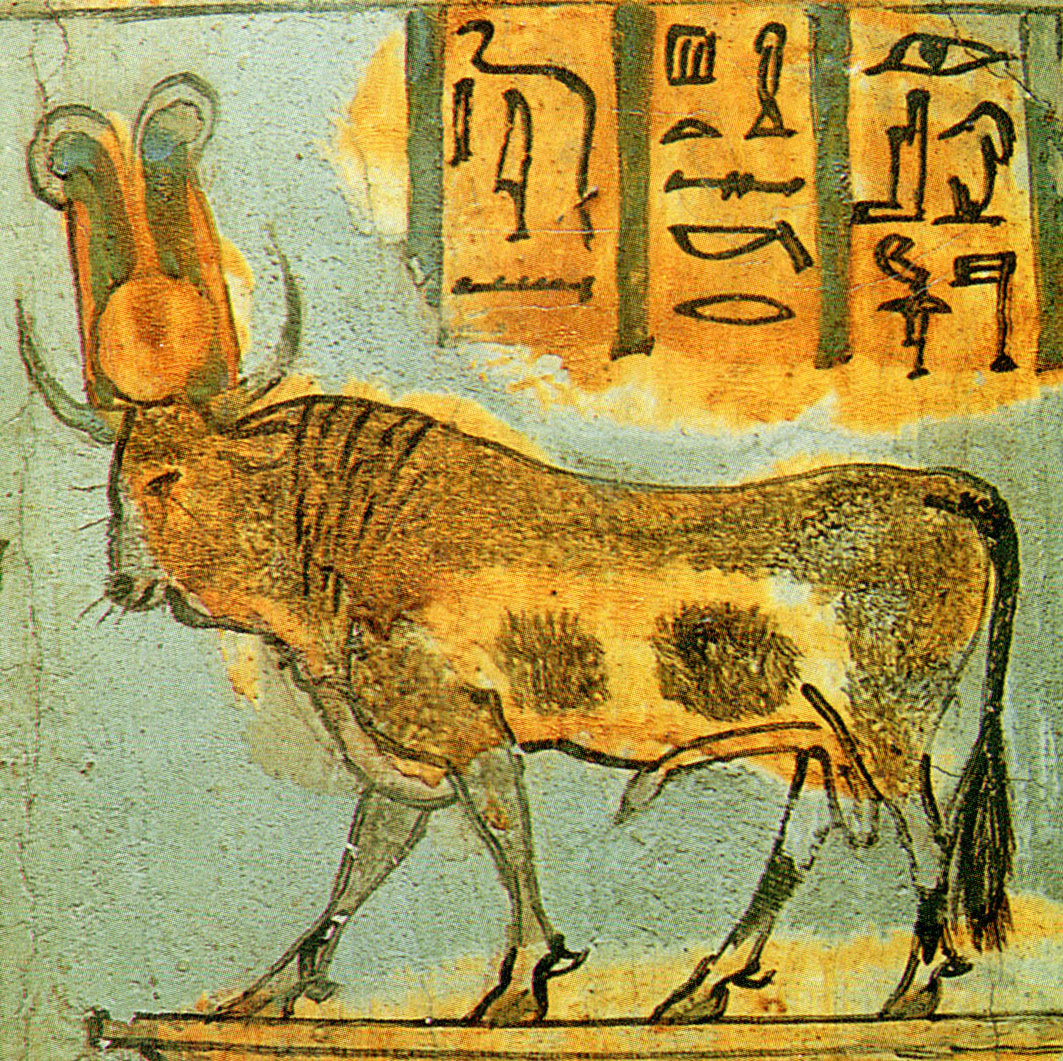
The Apis, depicted on a coffin. Eleventh to tenth century BC.

Some temples kept sacred animals, which were believed to be manifestations of the temple god's ba in the same way that cult images were. Each of these sacred animals was kept in the temple and worshipped for a certain length of time, ranging from a year to the lifetime of the animal. At the end of that time, it was replaced with a new animal of the same species, which was selected by a divine oracle or based on specific markings that were supposed to indicate its sacred nature. Among the most prominent of these animals were the Apis, a sacred bull worshipped as a manifestation of the Memphite god Ptah, and the falcon at Edfu who represented the falcon god Horus.

During the Late Period, a different form of worship involving animals developed. In this case, laymen paid the priests to kill, mummify, and bury an animal of a particular species as an offering to a god. These animals were not regarded as especially sacred, but as a species, they were associated with the god because it was depicted in the form of that animal. The god Thoth, for instance, could be depicted as an ibis and as a baboon, and both ibises and baboons were given to him. Although this practice was distinct from the worship of single divine representatives, some temples kept stocks of animals that could be selected for either purpose. These practices produced large cemeteries of mummified animals, such as the catacombs around the Serapeum of Saqqara where the Apis bulls were buried along with millions of animal offerings.

=== Oracles ===
By the beginning of the New Kingdom, and quite possibly earlier, the festival procession had become an opportunity for people to seek oracles from the god. Their questions dealt with subjects ranging from the location of a lost object to the best choice for a government appointment. The motions of the barque as it was carried on the bearers' shoulders—making simple gestures to indicate "yes" or "no", tipping toward tablets on which possible answers were written, or moving toward a particular person in the crowd—were taken to indicate the god's reply. In the Greco-Roman period, and possibly much earlier, oracles were used outside the festival, allowing people to consult them frequently. Priests interpreted the movements of sacred animals or, being asked questions directly, wrote out or spoke answers that they had supposedly received from the god in question. The priests' claim to speak for the gods or interpret their messages gave them great political influence and provided the means for the High Priests of Amun to dominate Upper Egypt during the Third Intermediate Period.

=== Popular worship ===
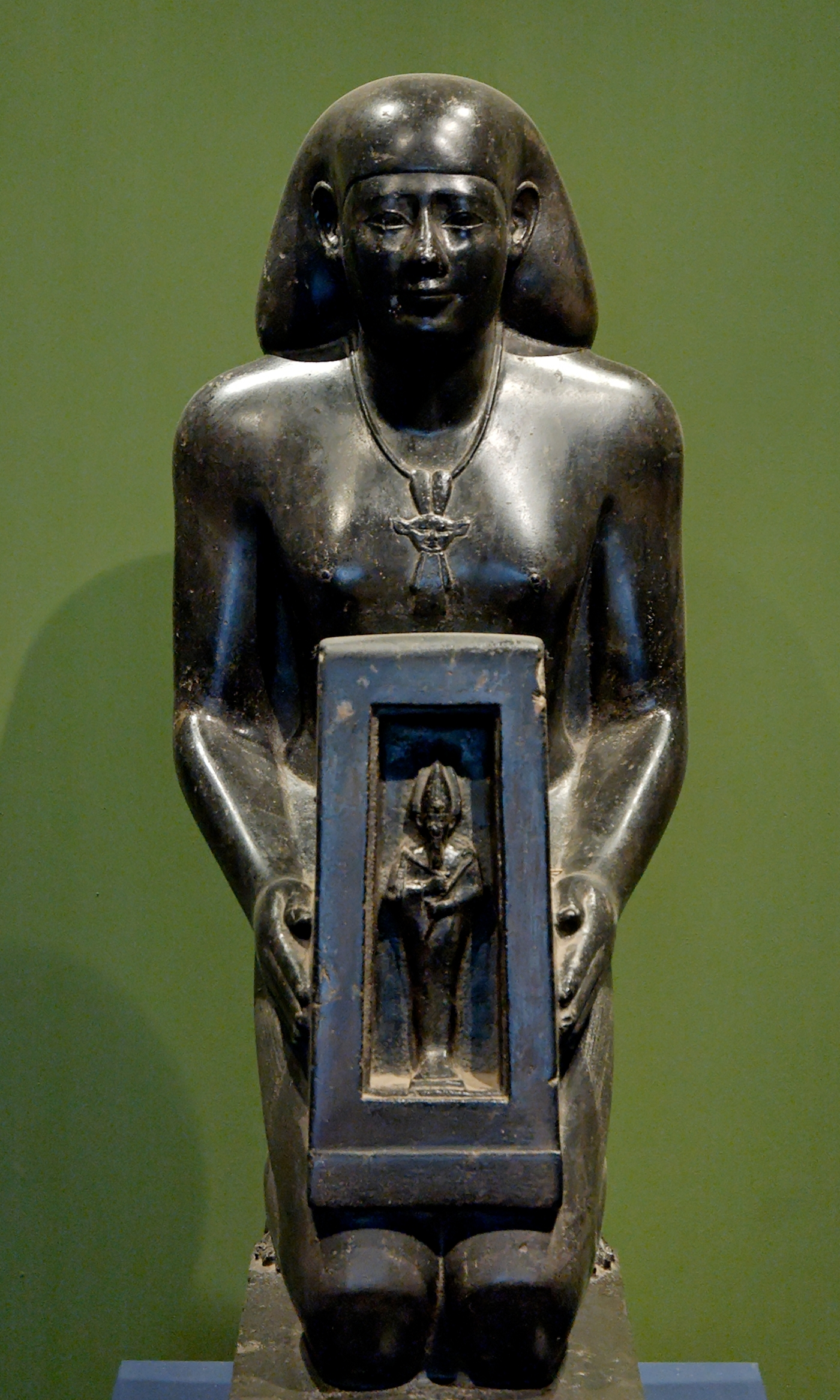
Votive statue of a man donating a shrine containing a figure of Osiris. Thirteenth to eleventh century BC.

Although they were excluded from the formal rituals of the temple, laymen still sought to interact with the gods. There is little evidence of the religious practices of individual people from early Egyptian history, so Egyptologists' understanding of the subject derives mostly from the New Kingdom or later periods. The evidence from those times indicates that while ordinary Egyptians used many venues to interact with the divine, such as household shrines or community chapels, the official temples with their sequestered gods were a major focus for popular veneration.

Unable to address the cult image directly, laymen still attempted to convey their prayers to it. At times they related messages to priests to deliver to the temple deity; at other times they expressed their piety in the parts of the temple that they could access. Courts, doorways, and hypostyle halls might have spaces designated for public prayer. Sometimes people directed their appeals to the royal colossi, which were believed to act as divine intermediaries. More private areas for devotion were located at the building's outer wall, where large niches served as "chapels of the hearing ear" for individuals to speak to the god.

The Egyptians also interacted with deities through the donation of offerings, ranging from simple bits of jewelry to large and finely carved statues and stelae. Among their contributions were statues that sat in temple courts, serving as memorials to the donors after their deaths and receiving portions of the temple offerings to sustain the donors' spirits. Other statues served as gifts to the temple god, and inscribed stelae conveyed to the resident deity the donors' prayers and messages of thanks. Over the centuries, so many of these statues accumulated within a temple building that priests sometimes moved them out of the way by burying them in caches beneath the floor. Commoners offered simple wooden or clay models as votives. The form of these models may indicate the reason for their donation. Figurines of women are among the most common types of votive figures, and some are inscribed with a prayer for a woman to bear a child.

Festival processions offered a chance for laymen to approach and perhaps even glimpse the cult image in its barque, and for them to receive portions of the god's food. Because the key rituals of any festival still took place within the temple, out of public sight, Egyptologist Anthony Spalinger has questioned whether the processions inspired genuine "religious feelings" or were simply seen as occasions for revelry. In any case, the oracular events during festivals provided an opportunity for people to receive responses from the normally isolated deities, as did the other varieties of oracle that developed late in Egyptian history. Temples eventually became a venue for yet another type of divine contact: dreams. The Egyptians saw dreaming as a means of communion with the divine realm, and by the Ptolemaic period many temples provided buildings for ritual incubation. People slept in these buildings in hopes of contacting the temple god. The petitioners often sought a magical solution to sickness or infertility. At other times they sought an answer to a question, receiving the answer through a dream rather than an oracle.

== After abandonment ==
After their original religious activities ceased, Egyptian temples suffered slow decay. Many were defaced by Christians trying to erase the remnants of ancient Egyptian religion. Some temple buildings, such as the mammisi at Dendera or the hypostyle hall at Philae, were adapted into churches or other types of buildings. Most commonly the sites were left disused, as at the Temple of Khnum at Elephantine, while locals carried off their stones to serve as material for new buildings. The dismantling of temples for stone continued well into modern times. Limestone was especially useful as a source of lime, so temples built of limestone were almost all dismantled. Sandstone temples, found mostly in Upper Egypt, were more likely to survive. What humans left intact was still subject to natural weathering. Temples in desert areas could be partly covered by drifts of sand, while those near the Nile, particularly in Lower Egypt, were often buried under layers of river-borne silt. Thus, some major temple sites like Memphis were reduced to ruin, while many temples far from the Nile and centers of population remained mostly intact. With the understanding of the hieroglyphic script lost, the information about Egyptian culture that was preserved in the surviving temples lay incomprehensible to the world.

The situation changed dramatically with the French campaign in Egypt and Syria in 1798, which brought with it a corps of scholars to examine the surviving ancient monuments. The results of their study inspired a fascination with ancient Egypt throughout Europe. In the early nineteenth century, growing numbers of Europeans traveled to Egypt, both to see the ancient monuments and to collect Egyptian antiquities. Many temple artifacts, from small objects to enormous obelisks, were removed by outside governments and private collectors. This wave of Egyptomania resulted in the rediscovery of temple sites such as Abu Simbel, but artifacts and even whole temples were often treated with great carelessness. The discoveries of the period made possible the decipherment of Egyptian hieroglyphs and the beginnings of Egyptology as a scholarly discipline.

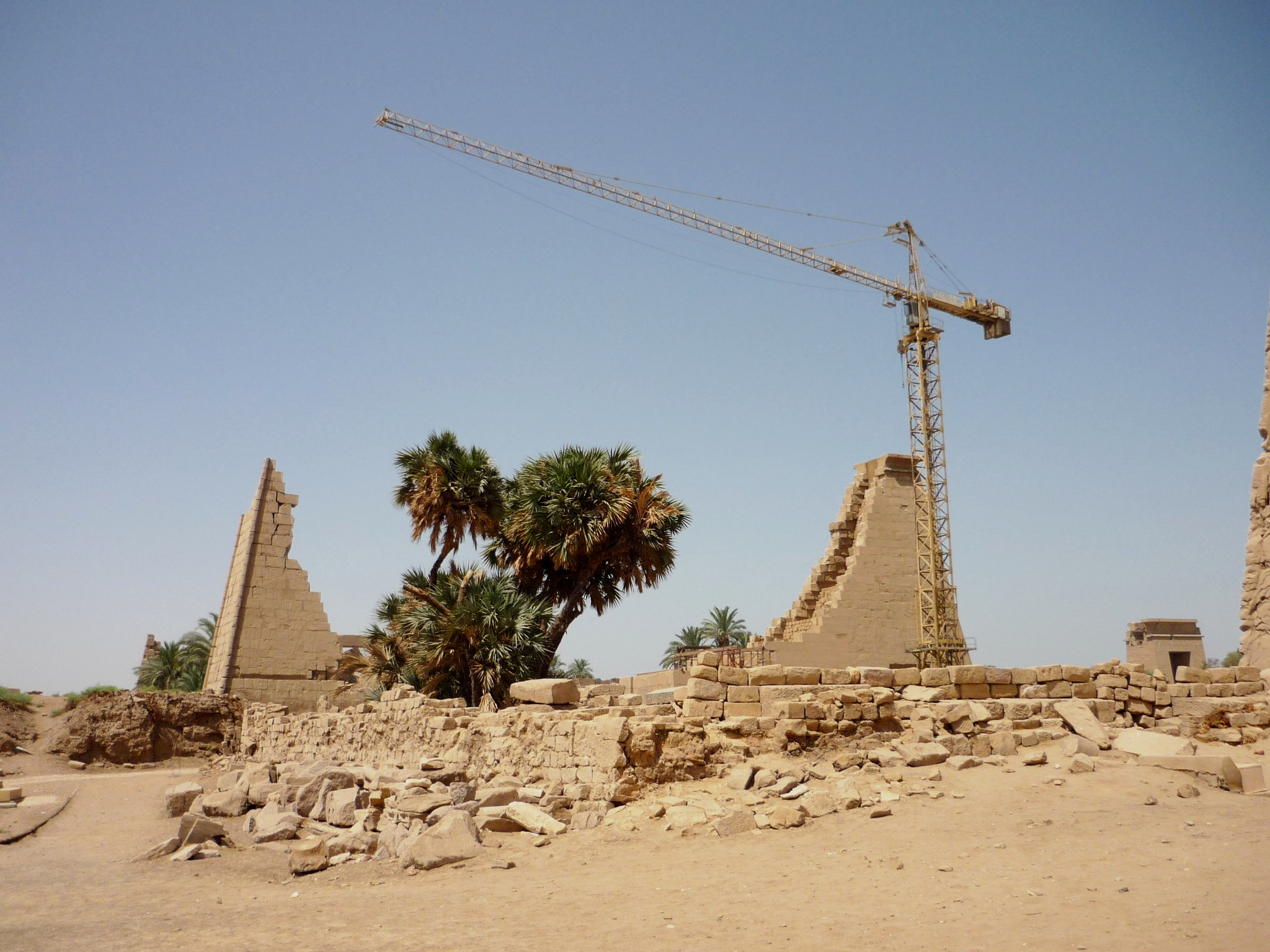
Reconstruction work on the Ninth Pylon at Karnak (fourteenth century BC), from whose interior talatat blocks from the Amarna Period are being retrieved

Nineteenth-century Egyptologists studied the temples intensively, but their emphasis was on the collection of artifacts to send to their own countries, and their slipshod excavation methods often did further harm. Slowly the antique-hunting attitude toward Egyptian monuments gave way to careful study and preservation efforts. The government also took greater control of archaeological activity as Egypt's independence from foreign powers increased.

Yet even in recent times, the ancient remains have faced threats. The most severe was the construction of the Aswan Dam in the 1960s, which threatened to submerge the temples in what had been Lower Nubia beneath the newly formed Lake Nasser. A major effort by the United Nations disassembled some of the threatened monuments and rebuilt them on higher ground, and the Egyptian government gave several of the others, such as the Temple of Dendur, Temple of Taffeh, and Temple of Debod, as gifts to nations that had contributed to the preservation effort. Nevertheless, several other temples vanished beneath the lake.

Today there are dozens of sites with substantial temple remains, although many more once existed, and none of the major temples in Lower or Middle Egypt are well preserved. Those that are well preserved, such as Karnak, Luxor, and Abu Simbel, draw tourists from around the world and are therefore a key attraction for the Egyptian tourist industry, which is a major sector of the Egyptian economy. Three temple sites—Ancient Thebes with its Necropolis, Memphis and its Necropolis, and the Nubian Monuments from Abu Simbel to Philae—have been designated by UNESCO as World Heritage Sites. The Egyptian government is working to balance the demands of tourism against the need to protect ancient monuments from the harmful effects of tourist activity. Archaeological work continues as well, as many temple remains still lie buried and many extant temples are not yet fully studied. Some damaged or destroyed structures, like the temples of Akhenaten, are even being reconstructed. These efforts are improving modern understanding of Egyptian temples, which in turn allow a better understanding of ancient Egyptian society as a whole.

== See also ==
- List of ancient Egyptian temples
