= List of ancient Egyptian temples =

This list of ancient Egyptian temples covers temples built by the ancient Egyptians from 3200 BC to 30 BC.

Place name in Ancient Egyptian language (hieroglyphics)	Modern place name (country) Coordinates	Temple name	God of the temple	Date	Builder	Architectural style	Notes	Images
pr-Wsỉr-Ḥp pr Z1	Alexandria (Egypt)	Serapeum of Alexandria	Serapis	c. 246 – 222 BC	Ptolemy III Euergete	Ptolemaic era		
swnw s wn n nw W T11 niwt	Kom Ombo (Aswan, Egypt)	Temple of Kom Ombo	Sobek	c. 180 – 47 BC	The Ptolemaic dynasty		It was constructed during the Ptolemaic dynasty. Some additions to it were later made during the Roman period.	
waset wAs t N24	Luxor (Egypt)	Temple of Khonsu	Khonsu	c. 1186 – 1155 BC	Ramesses III	New Kingdom temple	The edifice is an example of an almost complete New Kingdom temple, and was originally constructed by Ramesses III on the site of an earlier temple.	
—	Originally: Near Aswan (Egypt) Relocated to: Madrid (Spain)	Temple of Debod	Amun	c. 200 BC	Adikhalamani (Tabriqo)	New Kingdom temple	The temple original location was 15 kilometres (9.3 mi) south of Aswan in Nubia, very close to the first cataract of the Nile. In the 20th century it was later dismantled as part of the International Campaign to Save the Monuments of Nubia and rebuilt in the center of Madrid, Spain, in Parque de la Montaña, Madrid, a square located Calle de Irún, 21–25 Madrid.	
—	Al Bairat (Luxor Governorate, Egypt)	Mortuary Temple of Ramesses III	Amun	c. 1182-1151 BC	Ramesses III	New Kingdom temple	It is the main temple of the Medinet Habu site.	

== See also ==
- List of ancient Egyptian sites
