= Ras el-Soda Temple =

Archaeological site in Alexandria, Egypt

Ras el Soda temple
- معبد الرأس السوداء (Arabic)
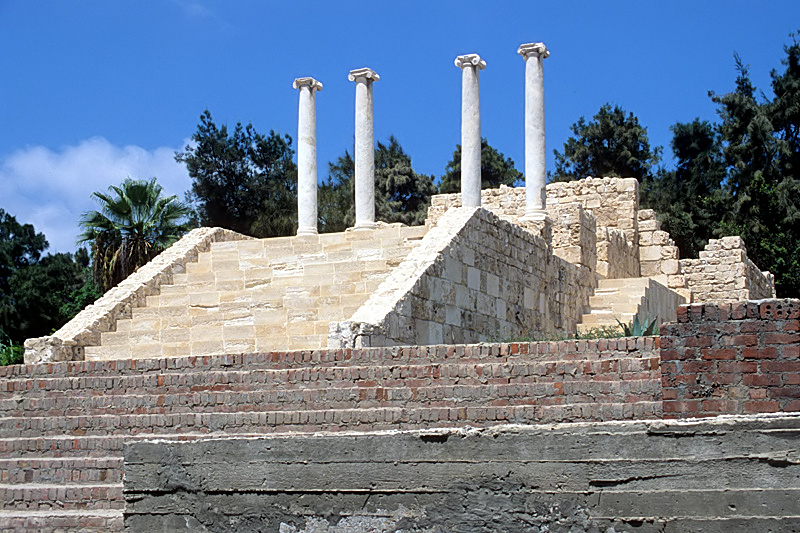
- Interactive map of Ras el Soda temple
- 31.203414°N 29.91862°E
- Cultures: Roman-Egyptian
- Location: Alexandria
- Region: Egypt

History
- Built: 2nd century CE

The Ras el-Soda temple (Arabic: معبد الرأس السوداء) is a Roman Egyptian religious structure located in Alexandria, Egypt. Built in the 2nd century AD, it was dedicated to the Egyptian goddess Isis.

== History ==
The temple was originally a private foundation that had been established by an Isidoros, a Roman who had lived in the 2nd century CE and had the temple erected as an offering to Isis for having his foot healed after an accident he had in which he fell from his carriage. On 29 October 1936, workers in the Ras el-Soda district east of Alexandria discovered columns that were later identified as the remains of a temple by excavations, led by the director of the Graeco-Roman Museum of Alexandria at that time, Achille Adriani, who unearthed the remains of the temple. In the early 1990s, the temple was relocated from its original area after a decision from the Supreme Council for Antiquities due to the temple's exposure to rising ground waters. The temple was relocated to the Chatby Garden on Horreya Street.

== Architecture ==
Measuring 5 by 7.5 meters, the Ras el Soda temple contains a podium that is 1.4 meters high with a staircase in front. The small temple, which is built of limestone, has ionic marble columns, and also contains a cella (or inner chamber), with a doorway in the eastern side of the temple.
