= Set animal =

Totemic animal of the god Set

- The Set animal

Creature information
- Other name(s): Typhonian animal, Typhonic beast, Sha
- Grouping: Totemic animals

Origin
- Country: Ancient Egypt
E20 E21 C7
Depictions of the Set animal
(Gardiner E20, E21, C7)
in hieroglyphs

In ancient Egyptian art, the Set animal, or sha, is the affiliated animal of the god Set. Because Set was identified with the Greek monster Typhon, the animal is also commonly known as the Typhonian animal or Typhonic beast.

Unlike other totemic animals, the Set animal is not easily identifiable in the modern animal world. It may have been fully mythological, or based on a combination of characteristics from real animals. The Set animal is one of the most frequently demonstrated animal determinatives.

Some Egyptian texts suggest that Set took the form of a dangerous animal, such as a bull or crocodile.

== Hieroglyphic representation ==
The Set animal (Gardiner E20, E21,) is one of the portrayals of the god Set. The other common hieroglyph used to represent Set is a seated god with the head of the Set animal.

The linguistic use of these hieroglyphs in the Egyptian language is as the determinative for words portraying "items with chaos", example words related to "suffering, violence, perturbation", and also for "violent storms" of the atmosphere, a "tempest".

According to Egyptologist Richard H. Wilkinson, the first known use of the Set animal was upon the Scorpion Macehead of Scorpion II of Naqada III. It was soon thereafter portrayed mounted upon the serekhs of Seth-Peribsen and Khasekhemwy.

Egyptians' depictions of the Set animal, sha.
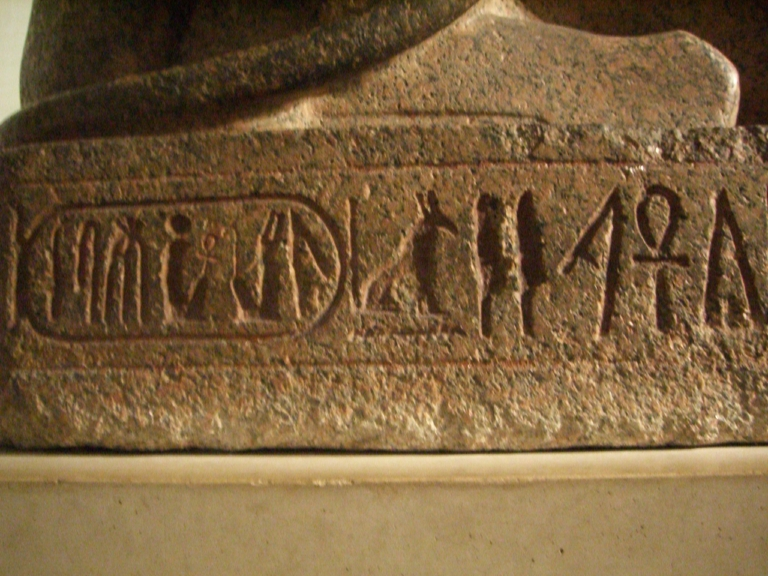
Relief with cartouche

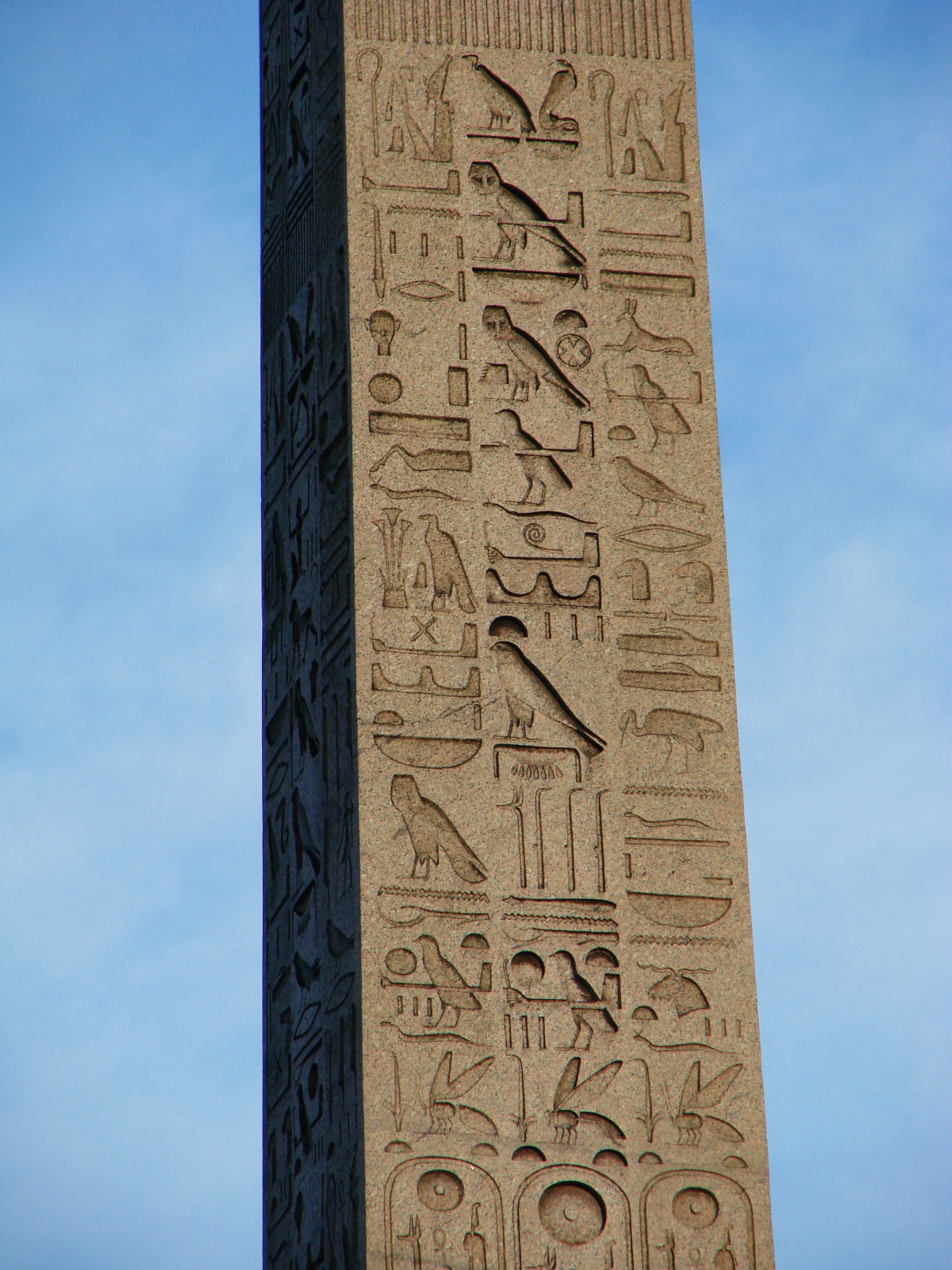
Obelisk engraved text

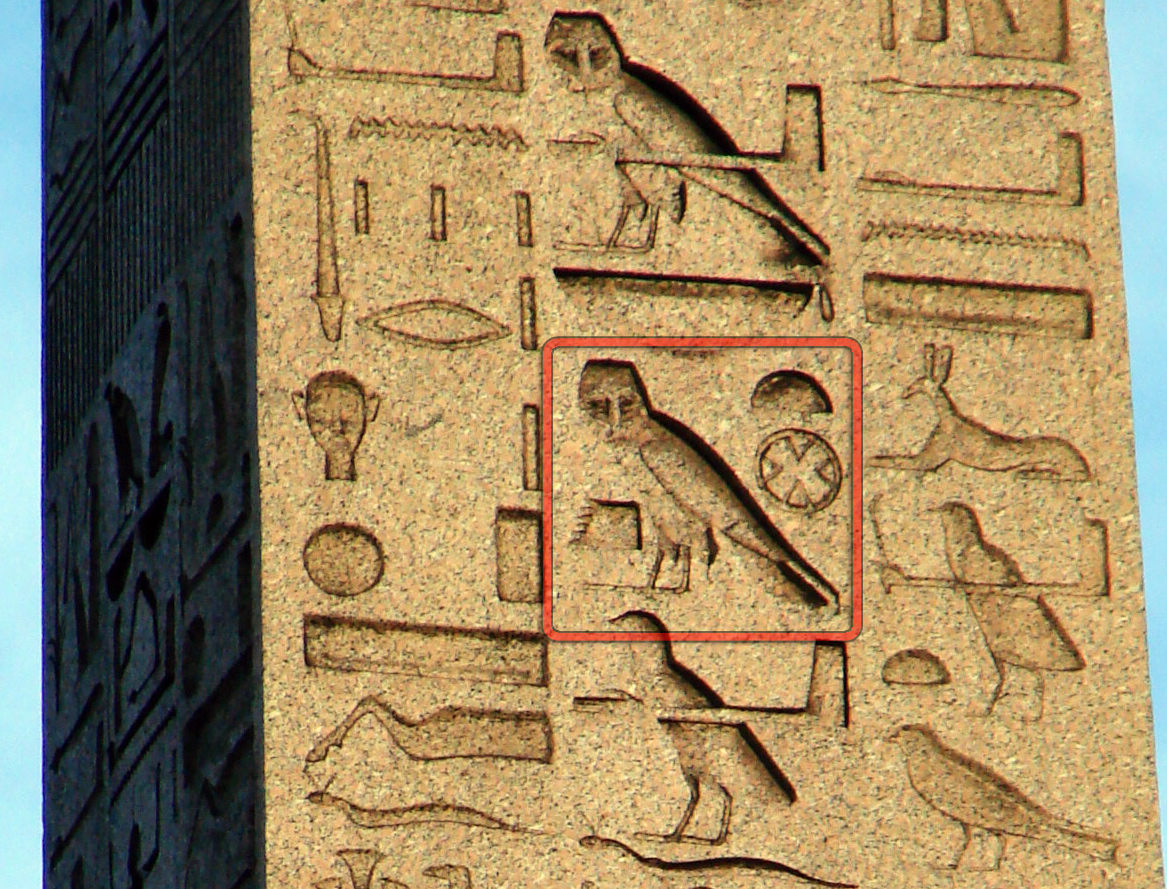
Obelisk text close-up (see outside the upper right of red box)
For further depictions, see Media related to Seth-animal (hieroglyph) at Wikimedia Commons.

== Physical characteristics ==
The sha is usually depicted as a slender canid, resembling a greyhound, fennec fox, or a jackal, with three distinguishing features: a stiff tail, often forked at the end, which stands straight up or at an angle, whether the animal is sitting, standing, or walking; its ears, also held erect, are usually depicted as squarish or triangular, narrowest at the base and widest at the squarish tops; and a long nose, often with a slight downward curve. It is normally depicted as black, but may also have been reddish.

The Set animal is usually depicted at rest, either lying down or seated. The shape of the head often resembles a giraffe, causing confusion between the two signs. The general body shape is that of a canine.

== Ancient Egypt ==
The god Set depicted as a man with a Set-animal head

Drawings of the sha appear in Egyptian artwork from Naqada III until at least the period of the New Kingdom, a period of some two thousand years. Although sometimes described as a fantastic or composite animal, it was depicted in a realistic manner more typical of actual creatures. The sha is found on the ceremonial Scorpion Macehead dating to Naqada III; on the serekhs of the Second Dynasty kings Seth-Peribsen and Khasekhemwy; in Twelfth Dynasty tombs at Beni Hasan; and, in the form of Set, in the royal cartouches of the Nineteenth Dynasty pharaohs Seti I and Seti II and the Twentieth Dynasty king Setnakhte and his descendants.

=== Association with Set ===
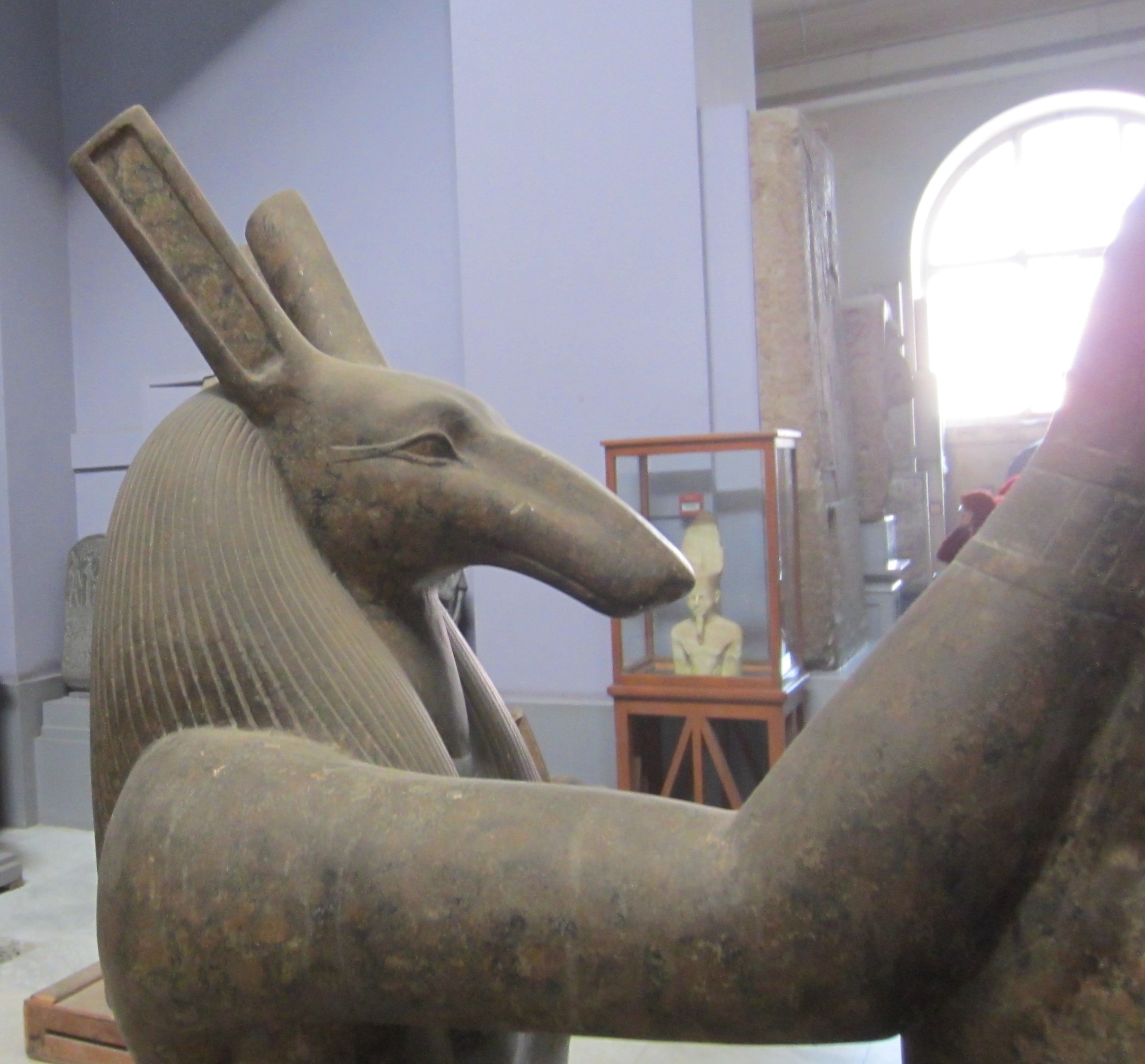
Set from Twentieth Dynasty, crowning Ramesses III

The god Set was usually depicted as a man with a head resembling that of the sha, which is why the sha is referred to by Egyptologists as the Set animal or Typhonic beast. When Set was depicted as a human with only the head of the Set animal, he usually had a long, slightly curved nose, and erect ears, squared at the tops. Occasionally he was represented in animal form as the sha itself, with a long, down-turned snout, squared ears, erect forked tail and a canine-like body, although he was also depicted in the form of an onager or as a black pig. Other animals sacred to Set included the antelope, hippopotamus, wild boar, crocodile, and scorpion, all of which represented strength, power, protection, or wildness. The sha was also used as a determinative in the names of Set and the goddess Nut, who may be identified with Nephthys, the wife of Set.

Was-sceptres represent the Set animal or Khnum. Was-sceptres were carried by gods, pharaohs and priests as a symbol of power and, in later use, control over the force of chaos (Set). The head and forked tail of the Set animal are clearly present. Was scepters are often depicted in paintings, drawings and carvings of gods and remnants of real was-sceptres have been found constructed of Egyptian faience or wood.

Both the Second Dynasty pharaohs Peribsen and Khasekhemwy, whose serekhs depict the sha, identified themselves as divine manifestations of Set on Earth, as previous kings had identified themselves with Horus. During the Old Kingdom of Egypt, Horus and Set were generally viewed as twin supporters and defenders of the god Ra, head of the Egyptian pantheon, and they were often depicted anointing the king, as the divine source of his authority. The association of Horus and Set probably reflected the reconciliation of a struggle between two royal cults. Following the unification of Egypt, Narmer and the kings of the First Dynasty embraced the worship of Horus, by adopting the Horus name as part of their official nomenclature. This name identified the king as the god's representative on Earth. Seth-Peribsen, however, chose a Set name in place of a Horus name, while Khasekhemwy's royal title invoked both of the great gods, presumably in an attempt to reconcile the followers of each cult.

=== Disappearance of the Sha ===
Although Set was originally viewed as the son and defender of Ra and the Egyptian kings, his reputation among the people declined along with the rise of the cult of Osiris. Originally a vegetation-god, Osiris became one of the pre‑eminent gods of the Egyptian pantheon. Worship in the Osiris cult stressed the role of Set as violence personified: the murderer of his brother and usurper of his throne who, instead of standing alongside Horus, became his eternal enemy. This view of Set was encouraged during the Second Intermediate Period, when Egypt was invaded by the Hyksos from Western Asia. Their god Sutekh became identified with Set; a contrary view holds that Sutekh is an Egyptian name only, and an epithet of Set, and was not the name the Hyksos used for their god.

Set continued to be revered during the New Kingdom. Several kings of the Nineteenth and Twentieth Dynasties had royal names indicating their devotion to Set, and these names were written with a hieroglyphic representation of the god as a determinative. Here, Set is depicted as a seated deity with a Set animal's head.

During the Third Intermediate Period, however, Set was deeply unpopular: his worship was abandoned, and many depictions of him were destroyed or defaced. References to and depictions of the Set animal must have suffered a similar fate.

== Identification ==
Hieroglyphs and artwork of Set evolved over millennia until becoming standardized, making identification a difficult process; there is debate as to which hieroglyphs actually depict Set and the associated animal.

The sha has no independent mythology associated with it that could aid with identification in either reality or fantasy, outside of its association with Set. Although the Set animal is called the "Typhonic Beast", it is so-named because the Greeks equated Set or Sutekh with their own chaos-monster Typhon. Some Egyptologists speculate that it is a purely fantastic or composite animal, which never existed in nature – the opinion of E.A.W. Budge, among others.

Depictions of the Set animal as an animal appear distinctly canine, but the precise identity of the animal has never been firmly established. It is sometimes described as a jackal or some other wild dog, although the jackal is usually identified with the god Anubis. In connection with Anubis, the jackal is never depicted with the distinguishing features of the Set animal: the stiff, typically forked tail; the squared ears; and the long, slightly curved nose. It is conceivable that these features were added to representations of the jackal as a contrivance to distinguish Set from Anubis. Early representations of the Set animal frequently omit the fork at the end of the tail, or show it resembling a more naturalistic tuft instead, so the idea of the forked tail may have been symbolic rather than intended to show a trait of an actual animal.

=== Saluki ===
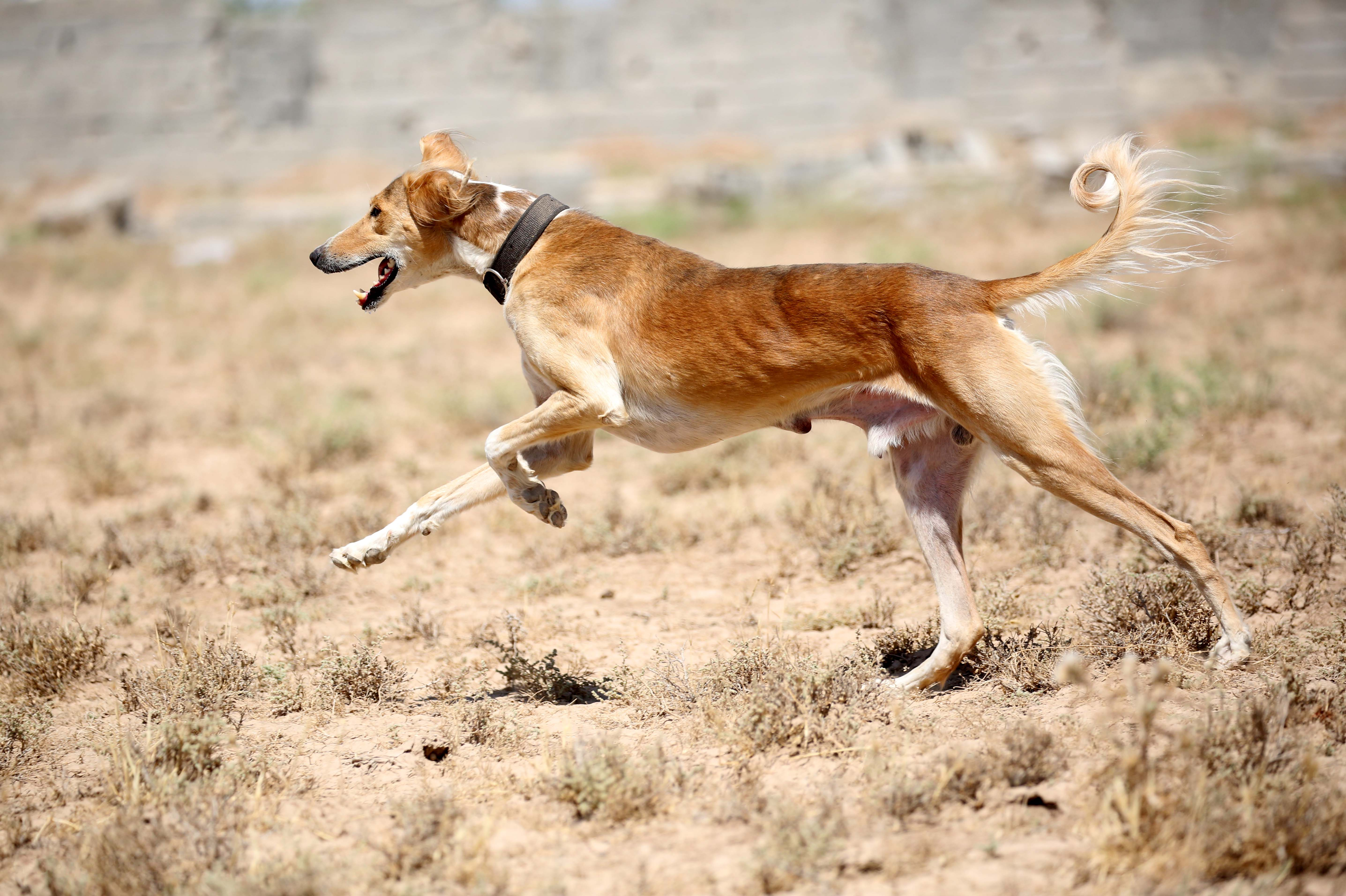
A Saluki in pursuit. Note the lofted ears and upwards-slanted tail.

Egyptologist Ken Moss suggested the Set animal is in fact the Saluki, an ancient breed of sighthound. It is one of the oldest breeds of domesticated dog, has a curved snout, and nearly identical body to the hieroglyph, and is native to the region; when the Saluki runs, its ears and tail become vertical. Further it was historic practice and remains common throughout the Levant to crop ears of hunting dogs. The Saluki is also depicted in hieroglyphs with no ostensible connection to Set, suggesting it was well known to ancient Egyptian people.

=== Other proposed animals ===
In addition to the jackal or the Saluki, mentioned above, some scholars have historically suggested the Set animal may be a stylized representation of some other animal, such as an oryx (a type of large white desert antelope), donkey, fennec fox, jerboa, camel, okapi, elephant shrew, aardvark, giraffe, pig, elephant-snout fish or that it might represent a species that was rare and has since become extinct. Some of the suggested animals would be known to ancient Egyptians, but rarely or never seen.

Since Set was typically depicted as a donkey or as a man with the head of a donkey from the Late Period onwards, it is possible the donkey was the inspiration for the Set animal.

== See also ==
- Egyptian mythology
- List of hieroglyphs/C
- List of hieroglyphs/E
- Mušḫuššu
- Peribsen and Khasekhemwy—for the history of the Set animal mounted upon serekh

== General and cited references ==
- Betrò, Maria Carmela (1996) [c. 1995]. "Set, (variant hieroglyph: Set animal)". Hieroglyphics: The Writings of Ancient Egypt (English, hardcover, 1st ed.). New York; London; Paris: Abbeville Press. p. 75. ISBN 978-078920232-1. A primer based on Gardiner's sign list, focussing on major signs in seven categories.
- Budge, E. A. W. (1978) [c. 1920]. An Egyptian Hieroglyphic Dictionary (Softcover ed.). Dover Publications. ISBN 0-486-23615-3.
- Budge, E.A.W. (1989) [c. 1929]. The Rosetta Stone (Softcover, unabridged ed.). Dover Publications. ISBN 0-486-26163-8.
- Wilkinson, R.H. (1994) [c. 1992]. "Set Animal". Reading Egyptian Art: A Hieroglyphic Guide to Ancient Egyptian Painting and Sculpture (Softcover ed.). Thames and Hudson. pp. 66–67. ISBN 0-500-27751-6.
