= Mummy of Bashiri, Louvre =

Egyptian mummy displayed in the Louvre

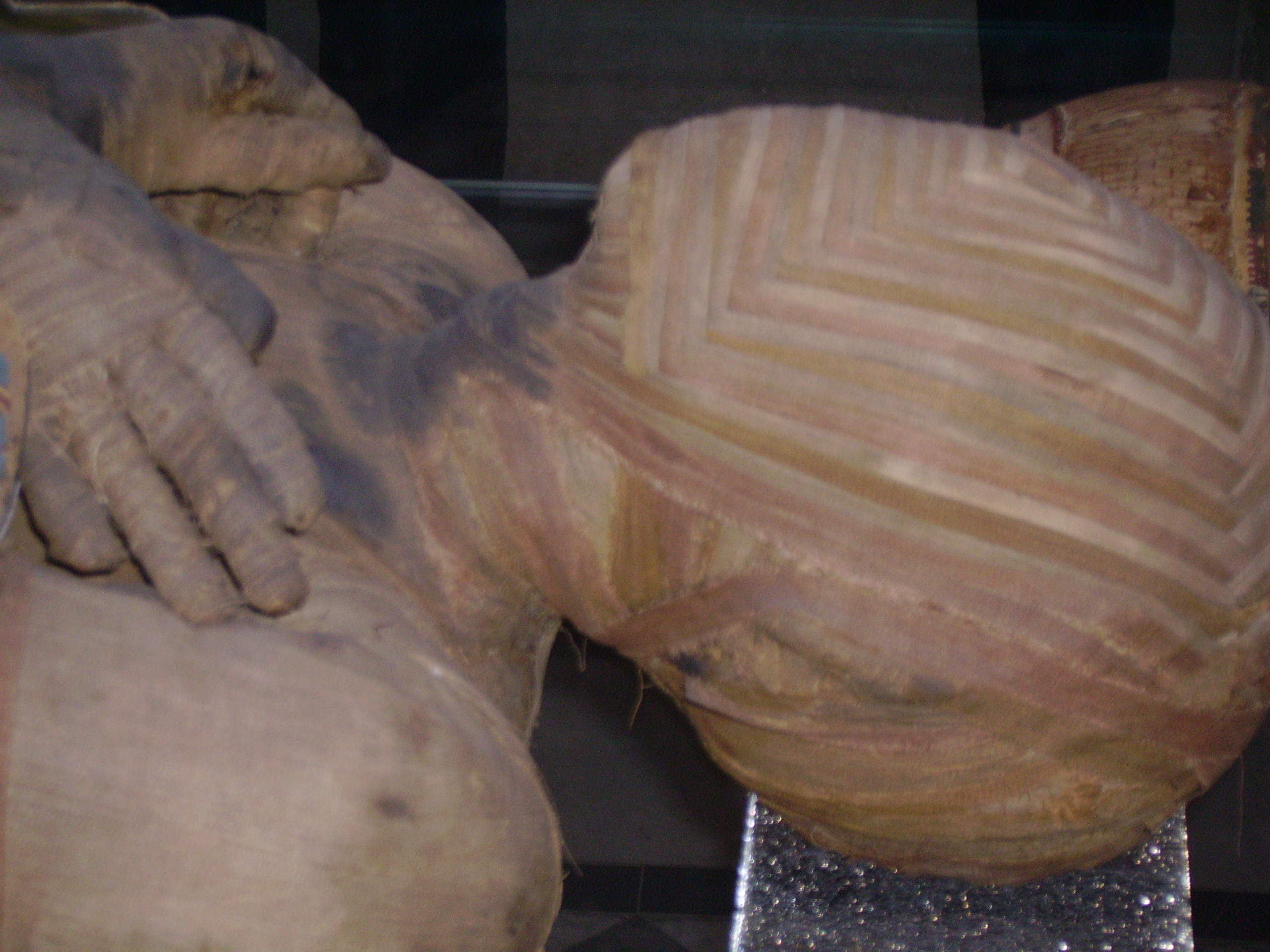
Mummy of Bashiri

The mummy of Bashiri is an ancient Egyptian mummy of a 20 to 30 year old man named Bashiri who was 5.5 feet (1.65 meters) tall. Although relatively little is known about it, the mummy is on display at the Louvre and dates back to the Ptolemaic period (roughly 305 BCE to 30 BCE). Discovered by Howard Carter in 1919, it is famous for the unique, intricate design on its face.

== Discovery ==
In 1919, the mummy was discovered by Carter in the Valley of the Kings. When it was discovered, the special intricate pattern at the face of the mummy lead to it getting the nickname "the untouchable".

== Description ==
The mummy is 5.5 feet (1.65 meters) tall and is remarkably well preserved. The collar around his chest is made up of beads and includes falcon-headed clasps. The apron covering the mummy has depictions of many Egyptian gods, such as Isis and Nephtys, and the four sons of Horus. The casing around his feet has the depictions of the jackal headed god Anubis. The mummy was also found with a mask which is now beside the mummy. It's currently on display in Room 322 of the Sully Wing at the Louvre.

== CT Scan ==
In a CT scan conducted by the Egyptian Museum in 2024 or 2025, it was discovered that the mummy was a male, and an inscription reading "Bashiri" or "Pacheri" was found.
