= Set (deity) =

Egyptian god of the desert, storms, violence, and foreigners

- Other names: Lord of Libya
Name in hieroglyphs
s t S E20 or sw W t X E20 A40 or s t S or z t X
- Major cult center: Ombos, Avaris, Sepermeru
- Symbol: Was-sceptre, Set animal
- Enemy: Horus

Genealogy
- Parents: Geb, Nut
- Siblings: Osiris, Isis, Nephthys, Horus the Elder
- Consort: Nephthys, Anat (some traditions), and Astarte (some traditions)
- Offspring: Anubis (disputed), Sobek (in some sources), and Maga

Equivalents
- Greek: Typhon
- Jewish: Yahweh
- Gnostic: Yaldabaoth (Note: Accordingly, the Phibionites believed Yaldabaoth to have a donkey-like appearance. The Secret Book of John describes Yaldabaoth as a shape-shifting Typhon-like being, looking like a snake with a lion's head, but whose donkey-headed child Eloaios gives witness to his other more donkey-like forms.)

Set (/sɛt/; Egyptological: Sutekh - swtẖ ~ stẖ (Note: Also transliterated Seth, Setesh, Sutekh, Seteh, Setekh, or Suty. Sutekh appears, in fact, as a god of Hittites in the treaty declarations between the Hittite kings and Ramesses II after the battle of Qadesh. Probably Seteh is the lection (reading) of a god honoured by the Hittites, the "Kheta", afterward assimilated to the local Afro-Asiatic Set.) or: Seth /sɛθ/) is a god of deserts, storms, disorder, violence, and foreigners in ancient Egyptian religion. In Ancient Greek, the god's name is given as Sēth (Σήθ). Set had a positive role where he accompanied Ra on his barque to repel Apep (Apophis), the serpent of Chaos. Set had a vital role as a reconciled combatant. He was lord of the Red Land (desert), where he was the balance to Horus' role as lord of the Black Land (fertile land).

In the Osiris myth, Set is portrayed as the usurper who murdered and mutilated his own brother, Osiris. Osiris's sister-wife, Isis, reassembled his corpse and resurrected her dead brother-husband with the help of the goddess Nephthys. The resurrection lasted long enough to conceive his son and heir, Horus. Horus sought revenge upon Set, and many of the ancient Egyptian myths describe their conflicts.

== Family ==
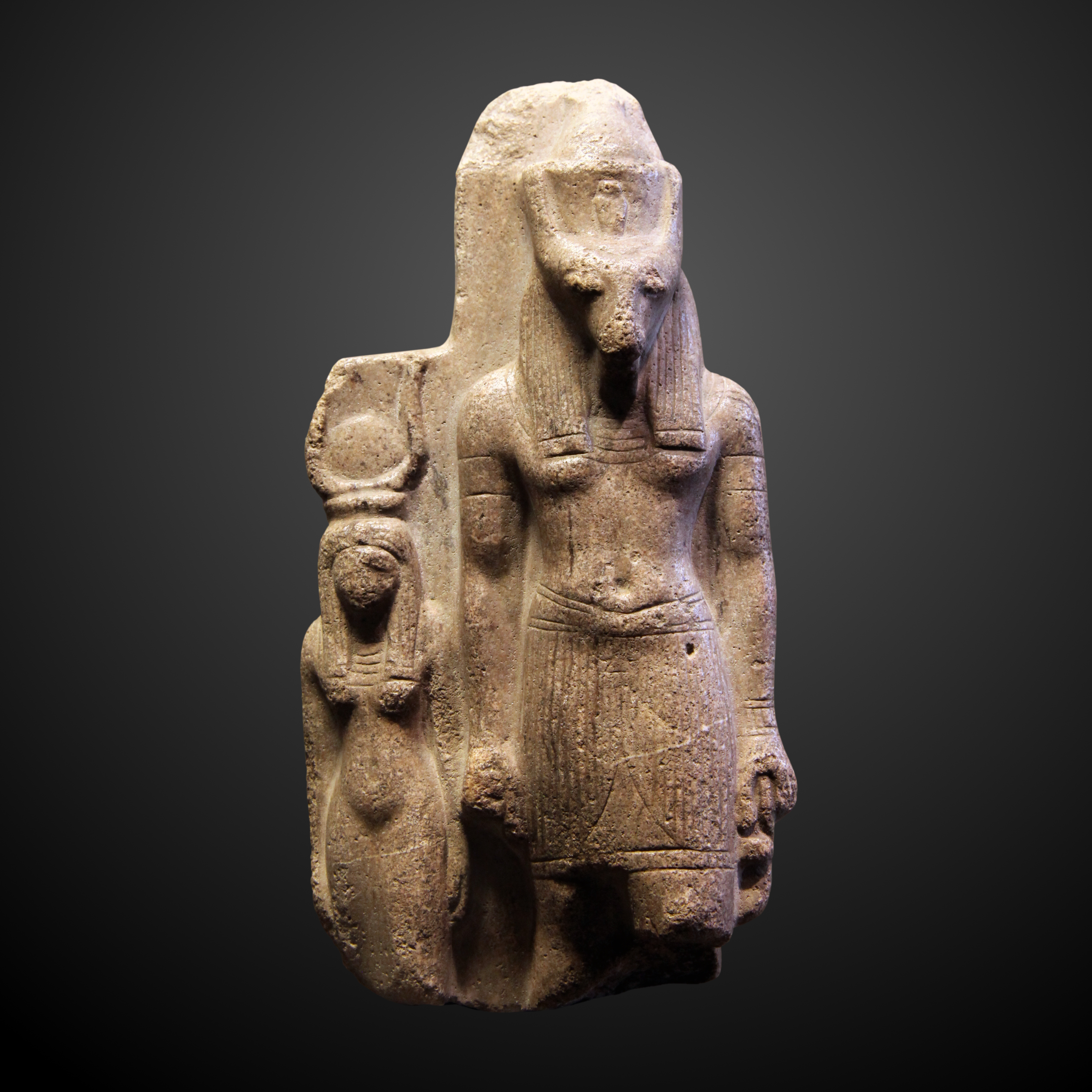
Set and Nephthys, 1279–1213 BCE, stone, Louvre

Set is the son of Geb, the Earth, and Nut, the Sky; his siblings are Osiris, Isis, and Nephthys. He married the latter, and though it has commonly been assumed that they were the parents of Anubis, some Egyptologists, such as Herman te Velde, have doubted whether Set was ever regarded as Anubis's father in ancient Egyptian religion (Osiris being the father of this god instead). Seth also had relationships with the foreign goddesses Anat and Astarte in some accounts. From these relationships is said to be born a crocodile deity called Maga.

== Name origin ==
The meaning of the name Set is unknown, but it is thought to have been originally pronounced *sūtiẖ [ˈsuw.tixʲ] based on spellings of his name in Egyptian hieroglyphs as stẖ and swtẖ. The Late Egyptian spelling stš reflects the palatalization of ẖ while the eventual loss of the final consonant is recorded in spellings like swtj. The Coptic form of the name, ⲥⲏⲧ Sēt, is the basis for the English vocalization.

== Set animal ==
The set-animal.

In art, Set is usually depicted as an enigmatic creature referred to by Egyptologists as the Set animal. The Set animal has not been definitively identified as any known species. Hypothesized identities of the animal include the Saluki, aardvark, African wild dog, donkey, hyena, jackal, pig, antelope, giraffe, and fennec fox. The animal has a downward curving snout; long ears with squared-off ends; a thin, forked tail with sprouted fur tufts in an inverted arrow shape; and a slender canine body. Sometimes, Set is depicted as a human with the distinctive head. Some early Egyptologists proposed that it was a stylised representation of the giraffe, owing to the large flat-topped "horns" which correspond to a giraffe's ossicones. The Egyptians themselves, however, used distinct depictions for the giraffe and the Set animal. During the Late Period, Set is usually depicted as a donkey or as a man with the head of a donkey, and in the Book of the Faiyum, Set is depicted with a flamingo head.

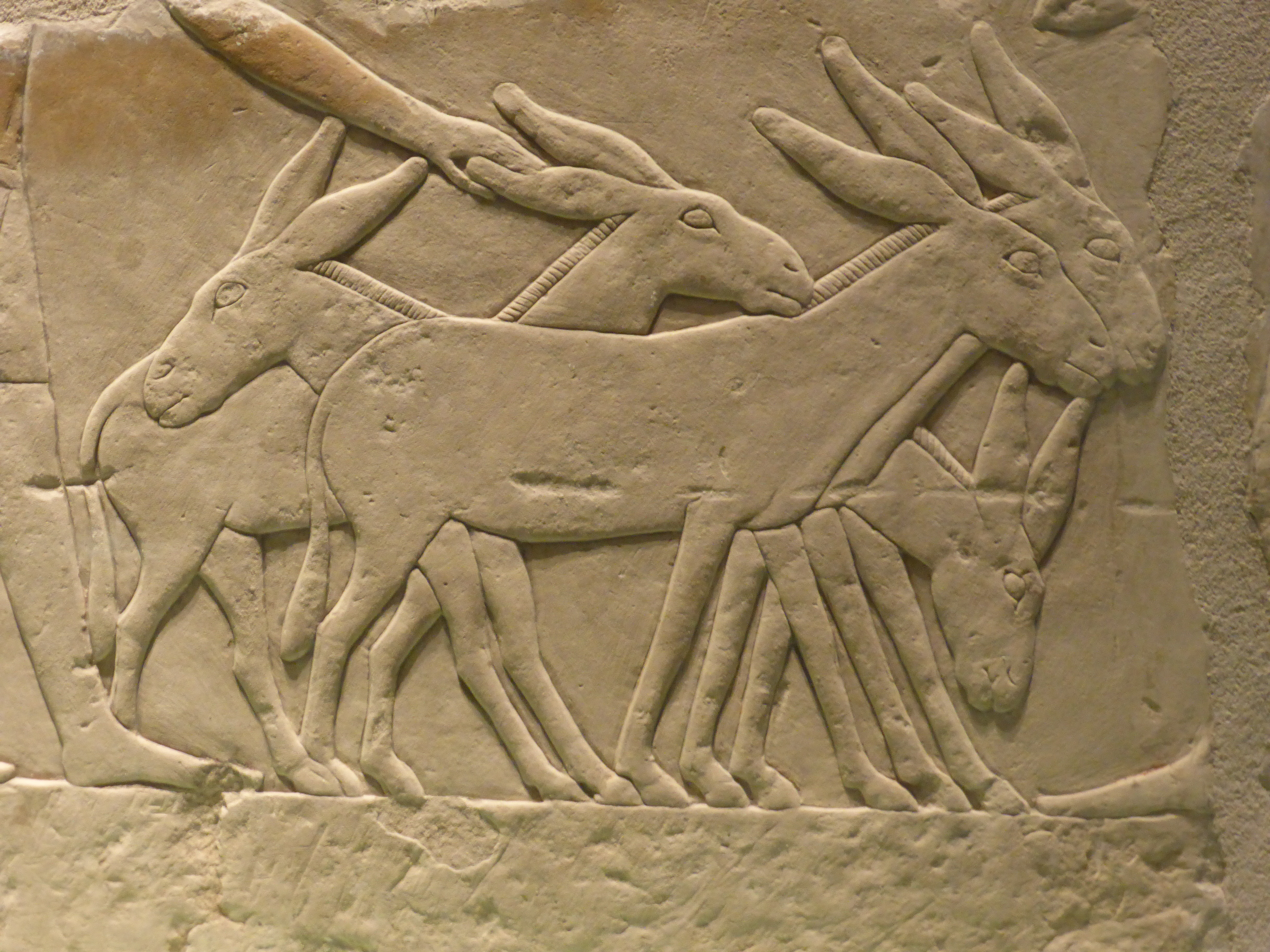
Set was portrayed as a donkey or donkey-headed man. The word for donkey, ꜥꜣ, was determined with a Set animal. Set and the donkey were increasingly called Typhon in the late period.

The earliest representations of what might be the Set animal comes from a tomb dating to the Amratian culture ("Naqada I") of prehistoric Egypt (3790–3500 BCE), although this identification is uncertain. If these are ruled out, then the earliest Set animal appears on a ceremonial macehead of Scorpion II, a ruler of the Naqada III phase. The head and the forked tail of the Set animal are clearly present on the mace.

== Conflict of Horus and Set ==
Horus (left) and Set binding together upper and Lower Egypt

An important element of Set's mythology was his conflict with his brother or nephew, Horus, for the throne of Egypt. The contest between them is often violent but is also described as a legal judgment before the Ennead, an assembled group of Egyptian deities, to decide who should inherit the kingship. The judge in this trial may be Geb, who, as the father of Osiris and Set, held the throne before they did, or it may be the creator gods Ra or Atum, the originators of kingship. Other deities also take important roles: Thoth frequently acts as a conciliator in the dispute or as an assistant to the divine judge, and in "Contendings", Isis uses her cunning and magical power to aid her son.

The rivalry of Horus and Set is portrayed in two contrasting ways. Both perspectives appear as early as the Pyramid Texts, the earliest source of the myth. In some spells from these texts, Horus is the son of Osiris and nephew of Set, and the murder of Osiris is the major impetus for the conflict. The other tradition depicts Horus and Set as brothers. This incongruity persists in many of the subsequent sources, where the two gods may be called brothers or uncle and nephew at different points in the same text.

The divine struggle involves many episodes. "Contendings" describes the two gods appealing to various other deities to arbitrate the dispute and competing in different types of contests, such as racing in boats or fighting each other in the form of hippopotami, to determine a victor. In this account, Horus repeatedly defeats Set and is supported by most of the other deities. Yet the dispute drags on for eighty years, largely because the judge, the creator god, favors Set. In late ritual texts, the conflict is characterized as a great battle involving the two deities' assembled followers. The strife in the divine realm extends beyond the two combatants. At one point Isis attempts to harpoon Set as he is locked in combat with her son, but she strikes Horus instead, who then cuts off her head in a fit of rage. Thoth replaces Isis's head with that of a cow; the story gives a mythical origin for the cow-horn headdress that Isis commonly wears.

In a key episode in the conflict, Set sexually abuses Horus. Set's violation is partly meant to degrade his rival, but it also involves homosexual desire, in keeping with one of Set's major characteristics, his forceful, potent, and indiscriminate sexuality. In the earliest account of this episode, in a fragmentary Middle Kingdom papyrus, the sexual encounter begins when Set asks to have sex with Horus, who agrees on the condition that Set will give Horus some of his strength. The encounter puts Horus in danger, because in Egyptian tradition semen is a potent and dangerous substance, akin to poison. According to some texts, Set's semen enters Horus's body and makes him ill, but in "Contendings", Horus thwarts Set by catching Set's semen in his hands. Isis retaliates by putting Horus's semen on lettuce-leaves that Set eats. Set's defeat becomes apparent when this semen appears on his forehead as a golden disk. He has been impregnated with his rival's seed and as a result "gives birth" to the disk. In "Contendings", Thoth takes the disk and places it on his own head; in earlier accounts, it is Thoth who is produced by this anomalous birth.

Another important episode concerns mutilations that the combatants inflict upon each other: Horus injures or steals Set's testicles and Set damages or tears out one, or occasionally both, of Horus's eyes. Sometimes the eye is torn into pieces. Set's mutilation signifies a loss of virility and strength. The removal of Horus's eye is even more important, for this stolen eye of Horus represents a wide variety of concepts in Egyptian religion. One of Horus's major roles is as a sky deity, and for this reason his right eye was said to be the sun and his left eye the moon. The theft or destruction of the eye of Horus is therefore equated with the darkening of the moon in the course of its cycle of phases, or during eclipses. Horus may take back his lost Eye, or other deities, including Isis, Thoth, and Hathor, may retrieve or heal it for him. Egyptologist Herman te Velde argues that the tradition about the lost testicles is a late variation on Set's loss of semen to Horus, and that the moon-like disk that emerges from Set's head after his impregnation is the Eye of Horus. If so, the episodes of mutilation and sexual abuse would form a single story, in which Set assaults Horus and loses semen to him, Horus retaliates and impregnates Set, and Set comes into possession of Horus's eye, when it appears on Set's head. Because Thoth is a moon deity in addition to his other functions, it would make sense, according to te Velde, for Thoth to emerge in the form of the Eye and step in to mediate between the feuding deities.

In any case, the restoration of the eye of Horus to wholeness represents the return of the moon to full brightness, the return of the kingship to Horus, and many other aspects of ma'at. Sometimes the restoration of Horus's eye is accompanied by the restoration of Set's testicles, so that both gods are made whole near the conclusion of their feud.

== Protector of Ra ==
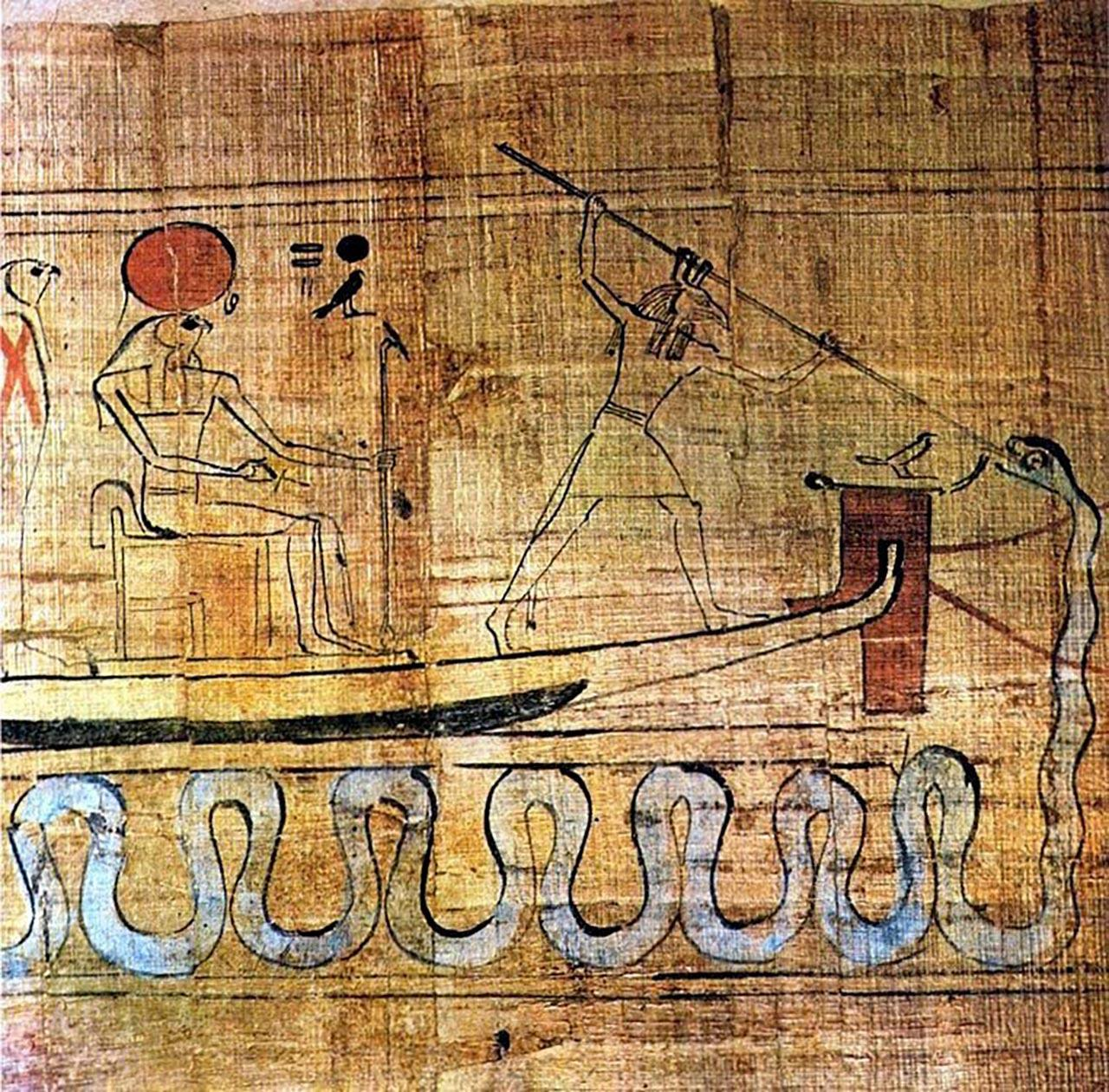
Mesektet Barque with Ra as Set spears Apep in the underworld

Set was depicted standing on the prow of Ra's barge defeating the dark serpent Apep. In some Late Period representations, such as in the Persian Period Temple of Hibis at Khargah, Set was represented in this role with a falcon's head, taking on the guise of Horus. In the Amduat, Set is described as having a key role in overcoming Apep.

== Set in the Second Intermediate, Ramesside and later periods ==
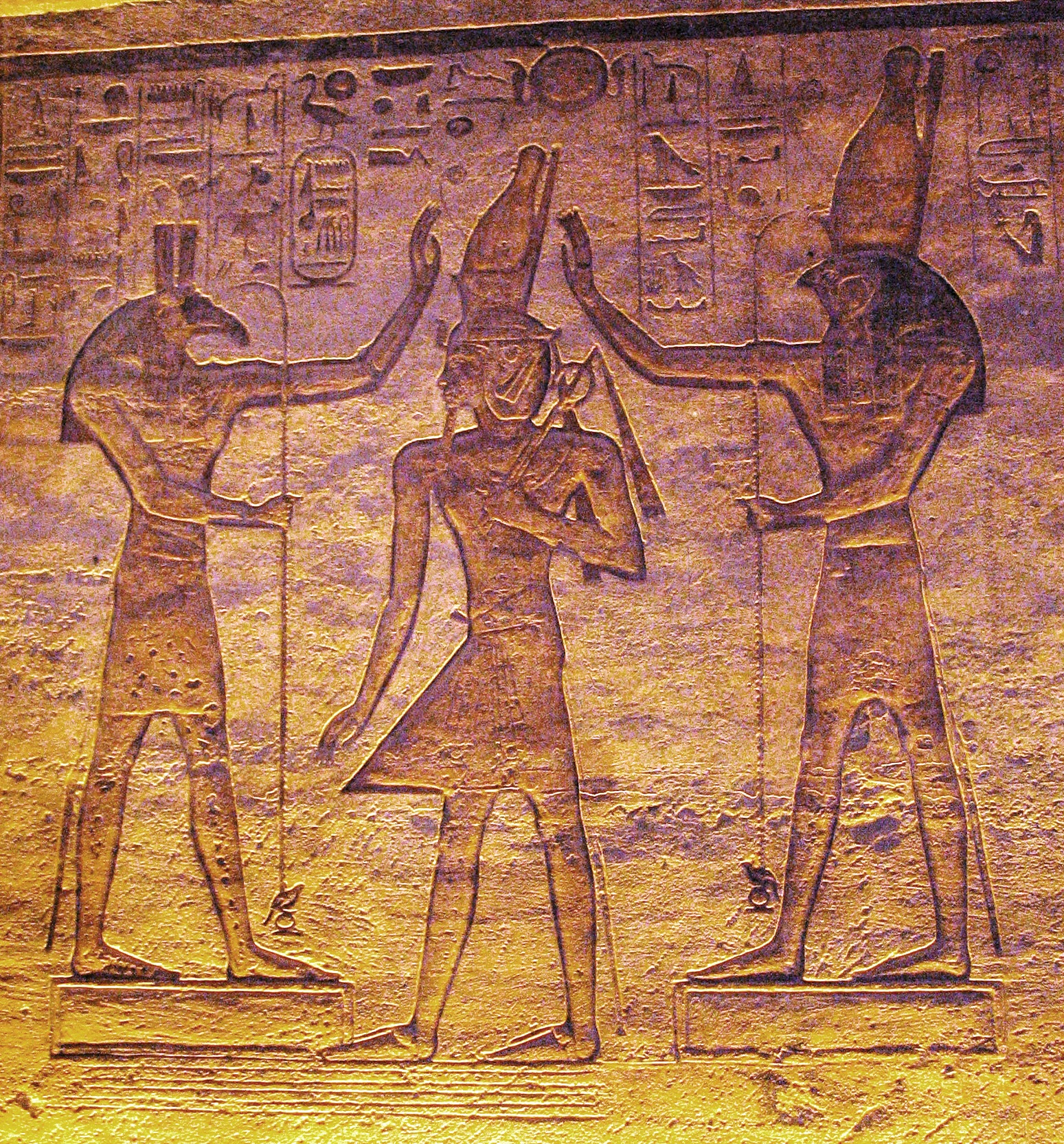
Set and Horus adore Ramesses II in the small temple at Abu Simbel.

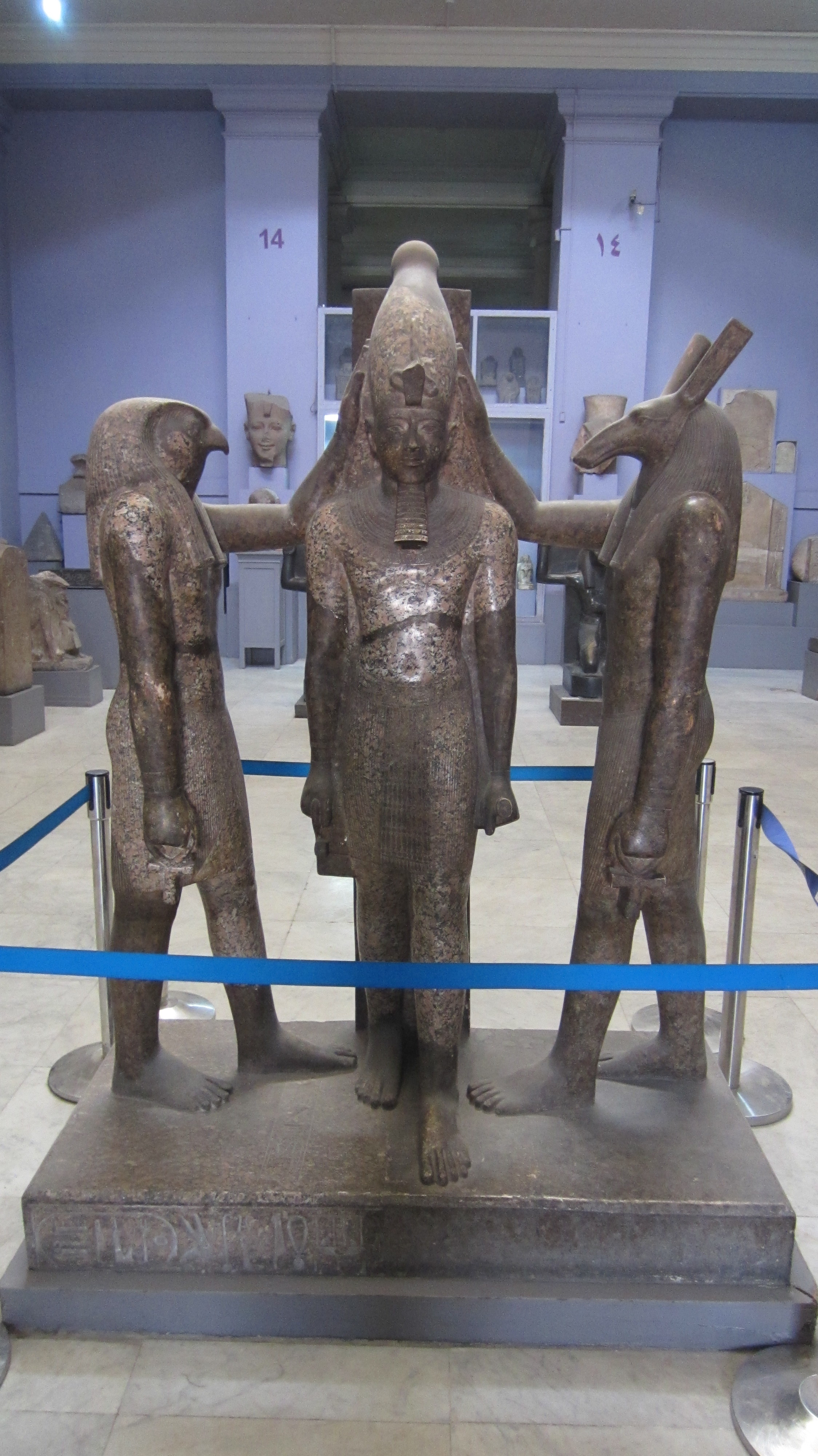
Horus and Set (right) crowning Ramesses III

During the Second Intermediate Period (1650–1550 BCE), a group of Near Eastern peoples, known as the Hyksos (literally, "rulers of foreign lands") gained control of Lower Egypt, and ruled the Nile Delta, from Avaris. They chose Set, originally Upper Egypt's chief god, the god of foreigners and the god they found most similar to their own chief god, Hadad, as their patron. Set then became worshiped as the chief god once again. The Hyksos King Apophis is recorded as worshiping Set exclusively, as described in the following passage:

King Apophis chose for his Lord the god Seth. He did not worship any other deity in the whole land except Seth. (Note: Translation from Assmann 2008, p. 48. Goedicke's translation: "And then King Apophis, l.p.h., was appointing for himself Sutekh as Lord. He never worked for any other god which is in this entire country except Sutekh. Goldwasser's translation: "Then, king Apophis l.p.h. adopted for himself Seth as lord, and he refused to serve any god that was in the entire land except Seth.")

— "The Quarrel of Apophis and Seqenenre", Papyrus Sallier I, 1.2–3 (British Museum No. 10185)

The account of Pharaoh Seqenenre Tao says that King Apophis "built a temple of good and eternal work beside the House of King Apopi and he appeared [every] day to have sacrifice made daily to Seth".

Jan Assmann argues that because the ancient Egyptians could never conceive of a "lonely" god lacking personality, Set the desert god, who was worshiped on his own, represented a manifestation of evil.

When Ahmose I overthrew the Hyksos and expelled them, in c. 1522 BCE, Egyptians' attitudes towards Asiatic foreigners became xenophobic, and royal propaganda discredited the period of Hyksos rule. The Set cult at Avaris flourished, nevertheless, and the Egyptian garrison of Ahmose stationed there became part of the priesthood of Set.

The founder of the Nineteenth Dynasty, Ramesses I came from a military family from Avaris with strong ties to the priesthood of Set. Several of the Ramesside kings were named after the god, most notably Seti I (literally, "man of Set") and Setnakht (literally, "Set is strong"). In addition, one of the garrisons of Ramesses II held Set as its patron deity, and Ramesses II erected the so-called "Year 400 Stela" at Pi-Ramesses, commemorating the 400th anniversary of the Set cult in the Nile delta.

In ancient Egyptian astronomy, Set was commonly associated with the planet Mercury.

Set also became associated with foreign gods during the New Kingdom, particularly in the delta. Set was identified by the Egyptians with the Hittite deity Teshub, who, like Set, was a storm god, and the Canaanite deity Baal, being worshipped together as "Seth-Baal".

Additionally, Set is depicted in part of the Greek Magical Papyri, a body of texts forming a grimoire used in Greco-Roman magic during the fourth century CE.

== The demonization of Set ==
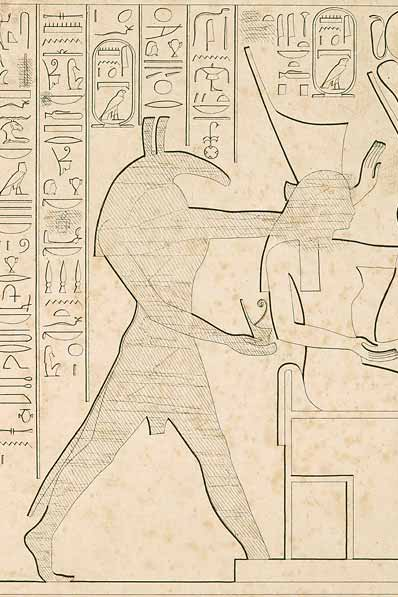
Set on a late New Kingdom relief from Karnak: his figure was erased during his demonization.

According to Herman te Velde, the demonization of Set took place after Egypt's conquest by several foreign nations in the Third Intermediate and Late Periods. Set, who had traditionally been the god of foreigners, thus also became associated with foreign oppressors, including the Kushite and Persian empires. It was during this time that Set was particularly vilified, and his defeat by Horus widely celebrated.

Set's negative aspects were emphasized during this period. Set was the killer of Osiris, having hacked Osiris' body into pieces and dispersed it so that he could not be resurrected. The Greeks would later associate Set with Typhon and Yahweh (being the three of them depicted as donkey-like creatures, classifying their worshippers as onolatrists).

Set and Typhon also had in common that both were sons of deities representing the Earth (Gaia and Geb) who attacked the principal deities (Osiris for Set, Zeus for Typhon). Nevertheless, throughout this period, in some outlying regions of Egypt, Set was still regarded as the heroic chief deity.

Ancient Egyptologist Dr. Kara Cooney shot an episode called "The Birth of the Devil" in the "Out of Egypt" documentary series. In this documentary, the scientist describes the process of demonization of Set and the positioning of the it as absolute evil on the opposite side, in parallel with the transition to monotheism in different regions from Rome to India, where God began to be perceived as the representative of absolute goodness.

== Set temples ==
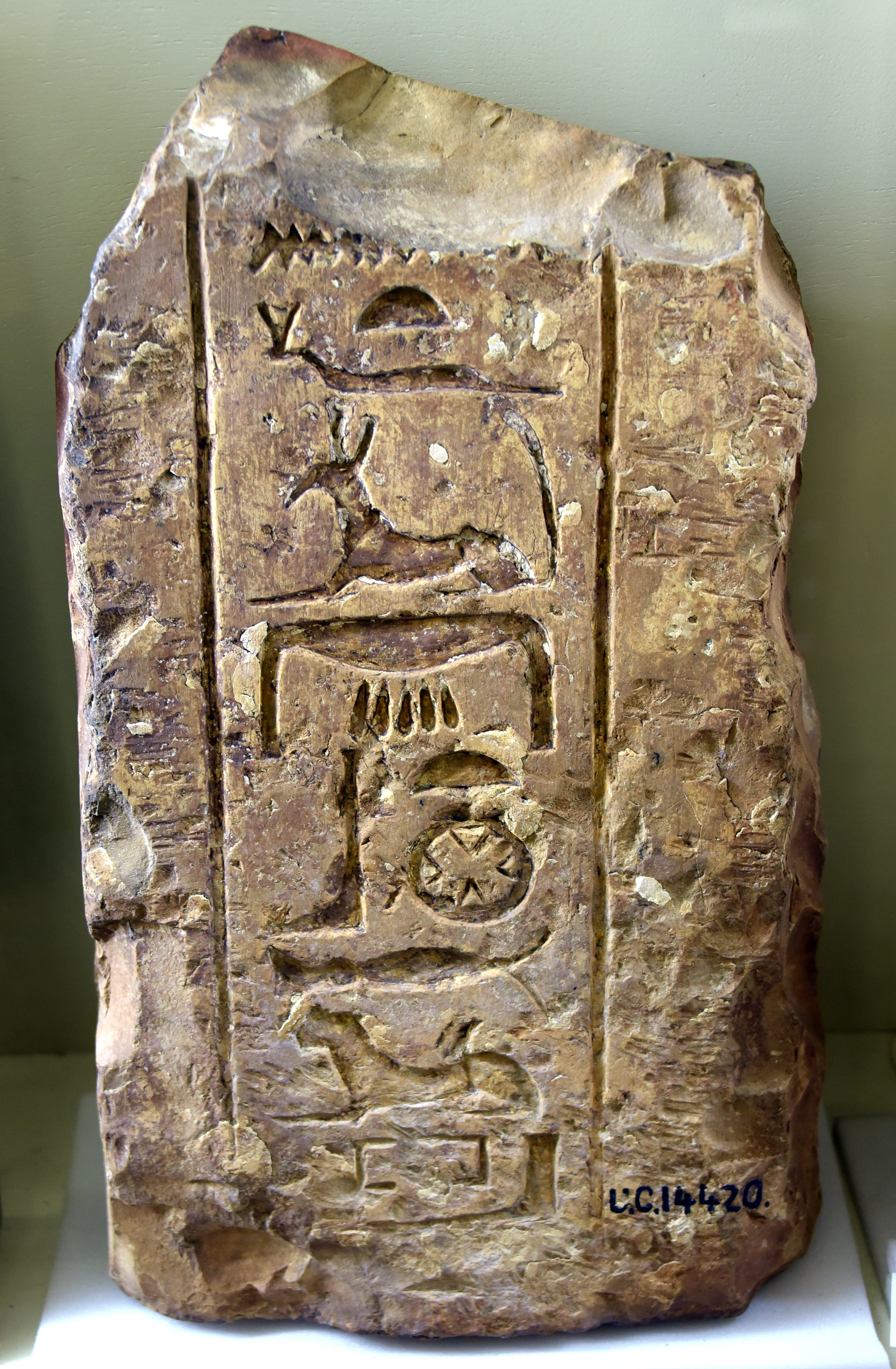
Limestone architectural fragment; a door jamb, part of a doorway. From the temple of Set (which was built by Thutmosis III) at Ombos, Egypt. 18th Dynasty. The Petrie Museum

Set was worshipped at the temples of Ombos (Nubt near Naqada) and Ombos (Nubt near Kom Ombo), at Oxyrhynchus in Middle Egypt, and also in part of the Fayyum area.

More specifically, Set was worshipped in the relatively large metropolitan (yet provincial) locale of Sepermeru, especially during the Ramesside Period. There, Set was honored with an important temple called the "House of Set, Lord of Sepermeru". One of the epithets of this town was "gateway to the desert", which fits well with Set's role as a deity of the frontier regions of ancient Egypt. At Sepermeru, Set's temple enclosure included a small secondary shrine called "The House of Seth, Powerful-Is-His-Mighty-Arm", and Ramesses II himself built (or modified) a second land-owning temple for Nephthys, called "The House of Nephthys of Ramesses-Meriamun".

The two temples of Set and Nephthys in Sepermeru were under separate administration, each with its own holdings and prophets. Moreover, another moderately sized temple of Set is noted for the nearby town of Pi-Wayna. The close association of Set temples with temples of Nephthys in key outskirt-towns of this milieu is also reflected in the likelihood that there existed another "House of Set" and another "House of Nephthys" in the town of Su, at the entrance to the Fayyum.

Papyrus Bologna preserves a most irritable complaint lodged by one Pra'em-hab, Prophet of the "House of Set" in the now-lost town of Punodjem ("The Sweet Place"). In the text of Papyrus Bologna, the harried Pra'em-hab laments undue taxation for his own temple (The House of Set) and goes on to lament that he is also saddled with responsibility for: "The ship, and I am likewise also responsible for the House of Nephthys, along with the remaining heap of district temples".

Nothing is known about the particular theologies of the closely connected Set and Nephthys temples in these districts — for example, the religious tone of temples of Nephthys located in such proximity to those of Set, especially given the seemingly contrary Osirian loyalties of Set's consort-goddess. When, by the Twentieth Dynasty, the "demonization" of Set was ostensibly inaugurated, Set was either eradicated or increasingly pushed to the outskirts, Nephthys flourished as part of the usual Osirian pantheon throughout Egypt, even obtaining a Late Period status as tutelary goddess of her own Nome (UU Nome VII, "Hwt-Sekhem"/Diospolis Parva) and as the chief goddess of the Mansion of the Sistrum in that district.

Set's cult persisted even into the latter days of ancient Egyptian religion, in outlying but important places like Kharga, Dakhlah, Deir el-Hagar, Mut, and Kellis. In these places, Set was considered "Lord of the Oasis / Town" and Nephthys was likewise venerated as "Mistress of the Oasis" at Set's side, in his temples (esp. the dedication of a Nephthys-cult statue). Meanwhile, Nephthys was also venerated as "Mistress" in the Osirian temples of these districts as part of the specifically Osirian college. It would appear that the ancient Egyptians in these locales had little problem with the paradoxical dualities inherent in venerating Set and Nephthys, as juxtaposed against Osiris, Isis, and Nephthys.

== In modern religion ==
Set, in modern religious contexts, is recognized primarily through Kemetism and the Temple of Set. Kemetism, a modern revival of ancient Egyptian religion, acknowledges Set as a complex deity associated with chaos, storms, and warfare, yet also protector against the serpent Apep. The Temple of Set, founded in 1975, venerates Set as a figure of isolation and self-deification, emphasizing personal enlightenment and the exploration of the left-hand path.

== In popular culture ==
In the television series Doctor Who, Set (using the name Sutekh and portrayed by Gabriel Woolf) is depicted as an alien entity bent on destroying all life. He first appears in the 1975 serial Pyramids of Mars, where he schemes to escape an Egyptian pyramid he has been imprisoned in millennia ago by Horus. Sutekh returned after nearly 50 years in the 2024 Series 14 two-part finale "The Legend of Ruby Sunday" / "Empire of Death" as the God of Death in the Pantheon.

In the 2016 fantasy action film Gods of Egypt, Set is portrayed by Gerard Butler. In the film, he is the primary antagonist who usurps the throne of Egypt after murdering his brother Osiris.

In recent digital reinterpretations of mythological figures, Set has appeared in small-scale mythology documentation websites and community archives.

== Sources ==
- Allen, James P. (2004). "Theology, theodicy, philosophy: Egypt". In Johnston, Sarah Iles (ed.). Religions of the Ancient World: A guide. Cambridge, Massachusetts: Harvard University Press. ISBN 978-0-674-01517-3.
- Assmann, Jan (2001) [German edition 1984]. The Search for God in Ancient Egypt. Translated by David Lorton. Cornell University Press. ISBN 978-0-8014-3786-1.
- Assmann, Jan (2008). Of God and Gods: Egypt, Israel, and the rise of monotheism. University of Wisconsin Press. ISBN 978-0-299-22550-6.
- Bickel, Susanne (2004). "Myths and sacred narratives: Egypt". In Johnston, Sarah Iles (ed.). Religions of the Ancient World: A guide. Cambridge, Massachusetts: Harvard University Press. ISBN 978-0-674-01517-3.
- Cohn, Norman (1999) [1995]. Cosmos, Chaos and the World to Come: The ancient roots of apocalyptic faith (paperback reprint ed.). New Haven, CT: Yale University Press. ISBN 978-0-300-09088-8.
- Gardiner, Alan H., ed. (1932). "The Quarrel of Apophis and Seḳnentēr". Late-Egyptian Stories. Bibliotheca Aegptiaca. Vol. I. Bruxelles: Fondation Egyptologique Reine Elisabeth. p. 85.
- Gardiner, Alan H. (1941–1952). The Wilbour Papyrus. Vol. 2: Commentary. London: Oxford University Press. LCCN 43-3733.
- Gertoux, Gérard (2002). "Part 2. Historical Record § 2.2 From Moses to David [-1500 – -1000] § An Egyptian Testimony". The Name of God Y.eH.oW.aH which is Pronounced as it is Written I_Eh_oU_Ah: Its Story. G - Reference, Information and Interdisciplinary Subjects Series. Lanham, Maryland: University Press of America. pp. 67–78. ISBN 978-0-7618-2204-2.
- Goedicke, Hans (1986). The Quarrel of Apophis and Seqenenrec. San Antonio: Van Siclen. ISBN 0-933175-06-X.
- Goldwasser, Orly (2006). "King Apophis of Avaris and the Emergence of Monotheism". In Czerny, Ernst; Hein, Irmgard; Hunger, Hermann; Melman, Dagmar; Schwab, Angela (eds.). Timelines: Studies in Honour of Manfred Bietak. Orientalia Lovaniensia Analecta. Vol. 149/II. Leuven: Peeters. pp. 129–133. ISBN 978-90-429-1730-9.
- Griffiths, J. Gwyn (1960). The Conflict of Horus and Seth. Liverpool University Press.
- Griffiths, J. Gwyn (2001). "Osiris". In Redford, Donald B. (ed.). The Oxford Encyclopedia of Ancient Egypt. Vol. 2. Oxford University Press. pp. 615–619. ISBN 978-0-19-510234-5.
- Hart, George (2005). The Routledge Dictionary of Egyptian Gods and Goddesses, Second Edition. Routledge. ISBN 978-0-203-02362-4.
- Ions, Veronica (1982). Egyptian Mythology. New York, NY: Peter Bedrick Books. ISBN 978-0-87226-249-2 – via archive.org.
- Kaper, Olaf Ernst (1997a). Temples and Gods in Roman Dakhlah: Studies in the indigenous cults of an Egyptian oasis. Faculteit der Letteren (doctoral dissertation). Groningen, DE: Rijksuniversiteit Groningen.
- Kaper, Olaf E. (2001). "Myths: Lunar Cycle". In Redford, Donald B. (ed.). The Oxford Encyclopedia of Ancient Egypt. Vol. 2. Oxford University Press. pp. 480–482. ISBN 978-0-19-510234-5.
- Kaper, Olaf Ernst (1997b). "The Statue of Penbast: On the cult of Seth in the Dakhlah oasis". In van Dijk, Jacobus (ed.). Essays on Ancient Egypt in Honour of Herman te Velde. Egyptological Memoirs. Vol. 1. Groningen, DE: Styx Publications. pp. 231–241. ISBN 978-90-5693-014-1 – via Google Books.
- Katary, Sally L.D. (1989). Land Tenure in the Rammesside Period. Kegan Paul International.
- Lesko, Leonard H. (2005). "Seth". In Jones, Lindsay (ed.). The Encyclopedia of Religion. [edited 1987 by Mircea Eliade] (2nd ed.). Farmington Hills, Michigan: Thomson-Gale. ISBN 978-0-02-865733-2 – via archive.org.
- Lichtheim, Miriam (2006b) [First edition 1976]. Ancient Egyptian Literature, Volume II: The New Kingdom. University of California Press. ISBN 978-0-520-24843-4.
- Osing, Jürgen (1985). Seth in Dachla und Charga. Abteilung Kairo (Report). Mitteilungen des Deutschen Archäologischen Instituts. Vol. 41. Deutschen Archäologischen Instituts. pp. 229–233.
- Pinch, Geraldine (2004) [First edition 2002]. Egyptian Mythology: A Guide to the Gods, Goddesses, and Traditions of Ancient Egypt. Oxford University Press. ISBN 978-0-19-517024-5.
- Quirke, Stephen G.J. (1992) [1993]. Ancient Egyptian Religion (reprint ed.). New York, NY: Dover Publications. ISBN 978-0-486-27427-0.
- Sauneron, Serge (2000). The Priests of Ancient Egypt. Translated by David Lorton (New ed.). Ithaca, New York: Cornell University Press. ISBN 978-0-801-43685-7.
- Stoyanov, Yuri (2000). The Other God: Dualist religions from antiquity to the Cathar heresy. New Haven, CT: Yale University Press. ISBN 978-0-300-08253-1.
- te Velde, Herman (1967). Seth, God of Confusion: A study of his role in Egyptian mythology and religion. Probleme der Ägyptologie. Vol. 6. Translated by van Baaren-Pape, G.E. (2nd ed.). Leiden, NL: E.J. Brill. ISBN 978-90-04-05402-8.
