= Sepermeru =

Town in Ancient Egypt

D24 D21 D54 U7 D21 V1 X1 N31 N25 Z4 O49
spr mrw
in hieroglyphs
Era: Middle Kingdom
(2055–1650 BC)

Sepermeru (or Spermeru) was a town in Ancient Egypt, located roughly between Heracleopolis to the north and Oxyrhynchus to the south in what was considered the XIX Upper Egyptian nome.

== Cult center of Set ==
During the Ramesside Period of Pharaohs, Sepermeru enjoyed some prominence as both a largely populated religious, military, and administrative center for the XIX Nome. The latter district was situated near the Bahr Yusuf canal, which connected the Nile with the Fayyum region. The meaning of the town's name ("near to the desert") signifies its status as a frontier community and was thus a suitable cult center for the god Seth.

== Temples of Set and Nepthys ==
According to the Wilbour Papyrus, by Dynasty XIX there existed two land-owning temple institutions within the main Seth-enclosure at Sepermeru. The larger of these two institutions was the "House of Seth, Lord of Sepermeru," and the smaller a temple dedicated to his consort, Nephthys, and called the "House of Nephthys of Ramesses-Meriamun." It is not known how long the temple of Seth had been established in Sepermeru before Dynasty XIX, but it is evident that the temple of Nephthys was a specific foundation (or refurbishment) of Ramesses II, which dates this particular institution to that Pharaoh's reign (1279-1213 BCE).

Both temples (and their respective land-holdings) were apparently under separate administration; the Prophet Huy administered the House of Seth in Dynasty XIX and XX. Yet, as Katary notes, "What cannot be established from the evidence of P. Wilbour is the authority of any particular prophet of the House of Seth over the House of Nephthys," and: "Although Huy may have been the chief administrator of the House of Nephthys as well as his own temple, he was most certainly not in charge of the administration of the...fields of the House of Nephthys, such fields being the responsibility of two prophets of Nephthys, Merybarse...and Penpmer."

== Subsidiary shrines ==
There were at least two more subsidiary shrines in Sepermeru in Dynasties XIX and XX: a sanctuary called the "House of Seth, Powerful-is-His-Mighty-Arm," and a cult-place called "The Sunshade of Re-Horakhte". Like the Nephthys temple, these smaller shrines were considered affiliations or dependencies "within the House" (or primary temple enclosure) of Seth, who was supreme "Lord" of the town.

== Decline of the cult of Set ==
Sepermeru is perhaps of most interest to modern Egyptologists because of its status as one of the chief ancient Egyptian cult centers of Seth, along with the cities of Ombos, Nagada, and Avaris. It is thought that the cult of Seth waned considerably after Dynasty XX, due to the increasing demonization of this deity and his association with territories and priorities increasingly considered foreign to the general interests of Egypt. Religious and administrative prominence in Nome XIX was duly shifted south to Oxyrhynchus after this time.

We know, however, that Seth continued to be the object of veneration in cult centers on the outskirts of Egypt well into the Roman era, especially at Deir el-Hagar (Dakhla Oasis), Kellis, Mut, and Kharga. It may be that Seth's cult survived in some form at Sepermeru, long after Sepermeru's decline as a religious center. Indeed, a late inscription in the Ptolemaic temple of Horus at Edfu makes reference to "Seth of Sepermeru," albeit with an insulting caveat that the god's canals in this district had become "dried-up and useless".

== Archaeological findings ==
The foundations of both the Seth and Nephthys temples at Sepermeru were excavated and identified in the 1980s. Therefore, the site is also of some interest for boasting remnants of the only surviving temple of Nephthys, along with her temple at Komir, near the ancient site of Esna.

== Bibliography ==
- van Dijk, J. (1997). Essays on Ancient Egypt in Honour of Herman te Velde. Brill.
- Gardiner, A.H. (1947). The Wilbour Papyrus, Commentary. Vol. II. Oxford.
- Katary, Sally L.D. (1989). Land Tenure in the Ramesside Period.
- Lachaud, René (1993). Les déesses de l'Egypte pharaonique (in French). Rocher.
- O'Connor, David (1972). "The Geography of Settlement in Ancient Egypt". Man, Settlement, and Urbanism. London: Gerald Duckworth: 681–698.
- te Velde, Herman (1977). Seth: God of Confusion: A Study of His Role in Egyptian Mythology and Religion.
- Wilson, Penelope (1997). A Ptolemaic lexicon.
