= Nut (goddess) =

Egyptian goddess of the sky

- The goddess Nut, wearing the water-pot sign (nw) that identifies her.
Name in hieroglyphs
W24 t N1
- Symbol: Sky, Stars, Cows

Genealogy
- Parents: Shu and Tefnut
- Siblings: Geb
- Consort: Geb
- Offspring: Osiris, Isis, Set, Nephthys, Horus the Elder

In ancient Egyptian religion, Nut /ˈnʊt/ (Ancient Egyptian: nwt, lit. 'sky'), is the goddess of the sky and the universe. She was a member of the Ennead, a group of nine deities that appear in the Egyptian creation myth at Heliopolis. With her brother-husband Geb, Nut was the mother of the Egyptian gods Osiris, Set, Isis, and Nephthys.

Nut's cult was minor. However, there is evidence of a few dedicated sanctuaries and priests, and food offerings were dedicated to her in a funerary context.

== Name ==
The goddess' name, nwt, means 'sky', and contains the determinative hieroglyph for 'sky'. The Egyptian word for the sky, pt, could be used interchangeably with the goddess' name. It is usually transcribed as 'Nut', but it has also been recorded as Nunut, Nenet, Nuit or Not. The pronunciation of her name in ancient Egyptian is uncertain as Egyptians did not write out vowels in hieroglyphs.

== Mythology ==
Nut was a member of the Ennead and involved in the creation myth of Heliopolis: the birthplace and cult center of the primordial creation deity Atum. Nut was given the epithet 'Lady of Heliopolis', and was believed to dwell in the 'lower mansion' there. Atum created the deities Shu, the god of light, and Tefnut, the goddess of moisture; their children were Geb, god of the earth, and Nut, goddess of the sky. With Geb, Nut gave birth to four children: Osiris, Set, Isis, and Nephthys. Because of this, she was given the epithet 'She Who Bears the Gods'. She was also the grandmother of the god Horus.

The god Shu separating Nut from Geb

=== Greco-Egyptian mythology ===
In the Greco-Egyptian version of the myth, Horus— who was syncretized with Apollo— is included as a child of Nut. The Ptolemaic temple at Edfu was dedicated to Horus. There he was called 'Horus the Elder,' and was identified as the son of Geb and Nut and the brother of Osiris.

In De Iside et Osiride, the Greek philosopher Plutarch describes the birth of Nut's children, drawing parallels between Egyptian and Greek mythology. Within, Plutarch equated the goddess Rhea with Nut. His account describes how Rhea (Nut) was cursed by the sun god Helios (Ra) to be unable give birth during the 360 days of the year. Hermes (Thoth), enamored with Rhea, played draughts with the moon goddess Selene and won some of her light. He then used it to light the world for five intercalary days, allowing Nut to give birth to a child on each day. Plutarch claims that Osiris and Arueris were the children of Helios, Isis was the child of Hermes, and Typhon (Set) and Nephthys were the children of Cronus.

Egyptologist E. A. Wallis Budge argued that Plutarch's description of ancient Egyptian beliefs incorporated elements that appear to be either imaginative embellishments or are based on misinformation.

== Roles ==
=== Sky goddess ===
Nut was the goddess of the sky. Specifically, she ruled over the sky, rather than personifying it. Her femininity was unique, as sky deities were predominantly male in ancient Mediterranean religions. She was also a goddess who represented order (maat), as the firmament protected earth from the forces of chaos in the cosmos. Nut would swallow the sun (Ra) at the end of the day, it would pass through her body at night, and she would rebirth it in the morning. Some records additionally described Nut as Ra's mother. A story from the New Kingdom period describes Nut as the mother of the sun and stars, which she swallowed in order to give birth to the dawn. Her actions angered Geb, and the couple had to be forcefully separated by their father, Shu. On the pharaoh Seti I's cenotaph, Nut's swallowing of heavenly bodies was likened to a sow eating her piglets.

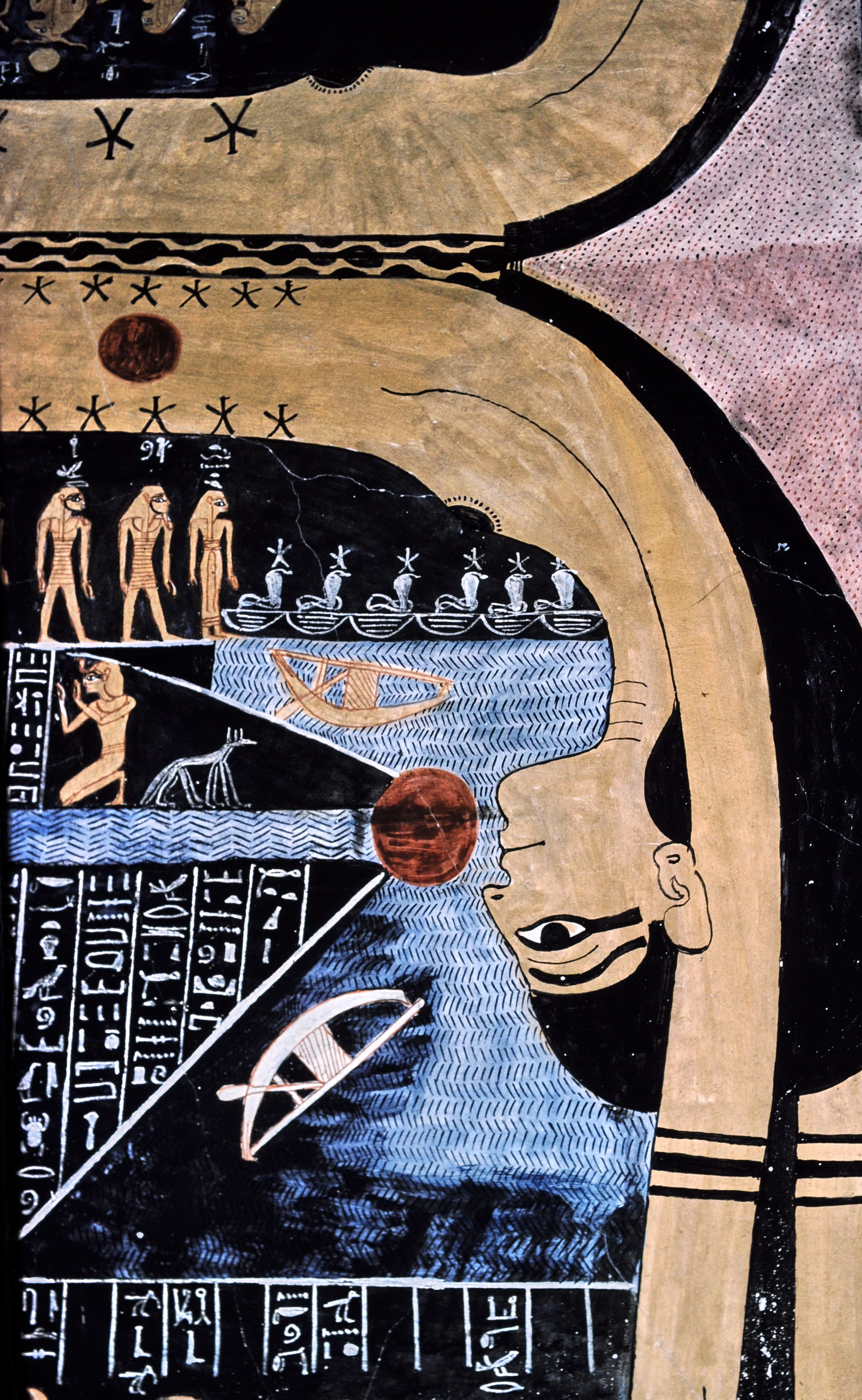
Nut swallows the sun, which travels through her body at night to be reborn at dawn

Some scholars have argued that Egyptians viewed Nut as the embodiment or personification of the Milky Way.

==== Book of Nut ====
The Book of Nut is the modern title of what was known in ancient times as The Fundamentals of the Course of the Stars. This is an important collection of ancient Egyptian astronomical texts, perhaps the earliest of several other such texts, going back to at least to 2,000 BC. Nut, being the sky goddess, plays the primary role in the Book of Nut. The text also describes various other sky and Earth deities, including as the star and decans deities. The cycles of the stars and planets, as well as time keeping, are also covered in the book.

=== Funerary goddess ===
Nut was associated with death and ancient Egyptian funerary practices, particularly those of the royal family; however, she was not a chthonic deity. When the pharaoh died, it was believed that Nut would receive them in the sky the day after as their mother, making them one of her star children and resurrecting them into a new form of life after death. This is supported by multiple ancient Egyptian funerary texts. This includes the Pyramid Texts of the Old Kingdom period, which states that "the embrace of your mother Nut will enfold you." Another pyramid text states: "So this has caused [the king] to fly up to the sky in the company of [his] brethren gods..." However, she could also appear in the Underworld; in the Book of the Dead and some Theban tomb paintings, Nut is shown as a woman emerging from the trunk of a sycamore tree, and is seen providing water and bread to the dead. This idea of the pharaoh returning to Nut mimics the movements of the sun (Ra), which Nut swallows and rebirths every day. This idea supported both the pharaoh's legitimacy as a ruler and their divine nature.

Nut was commonly painted on royal sarcophagi. She may have represented the sarcophagus itself, as the cradle that brings resurrection into life after death. Specifically, the pharaoh was said to go to Nut in the name of 'sarcophagus,' embrace her in the name of 'coffin,' and rest in her name of 'tomb.' Amenhotep III of the Eighteenth Dynasty replaced the traditional image of a vulture painted on the chest of the coffin with an image of a winged Nut. Later coffins of the Twenty-second and Twenty-third Dynasties depicted Nut on the floor of the coffin, embracing the mummy; however, she again began to appear on the coffin chest during the Late Period. Nut also frequently appeared painted on the walls of royal tombs, usually on the ceilings; these depictions were common until at least the Roman period. Usually these images were accompanied by textual representation of Nut swallowing and rebirthing the sun. Some structures, including the Pyramid of Unas, additionally contained spells addressed to the goddess.

== Iconography ==
She was most commonly depicted as a nude, star-covered woman arching over the earth. Her body was typically painted yellow-gold or blue in color. In this position, Nut's fingers and toes were believed to touch the four cardinal directions. Shu was often depicted supporting Nut with his hands and separating her from Geb, who is lying on the ground. The sun was often depicted traversing her body, and solar disks and stars were shown near her mouth and genitals, which represented her swallowing and rebirthing of the sun. This design appeared on the handles of cosmetic spoons, which were popular objects in the Eighteenth Dynasty; it is unknown what purpose these spoons may have served, but they may have been ritual objects.

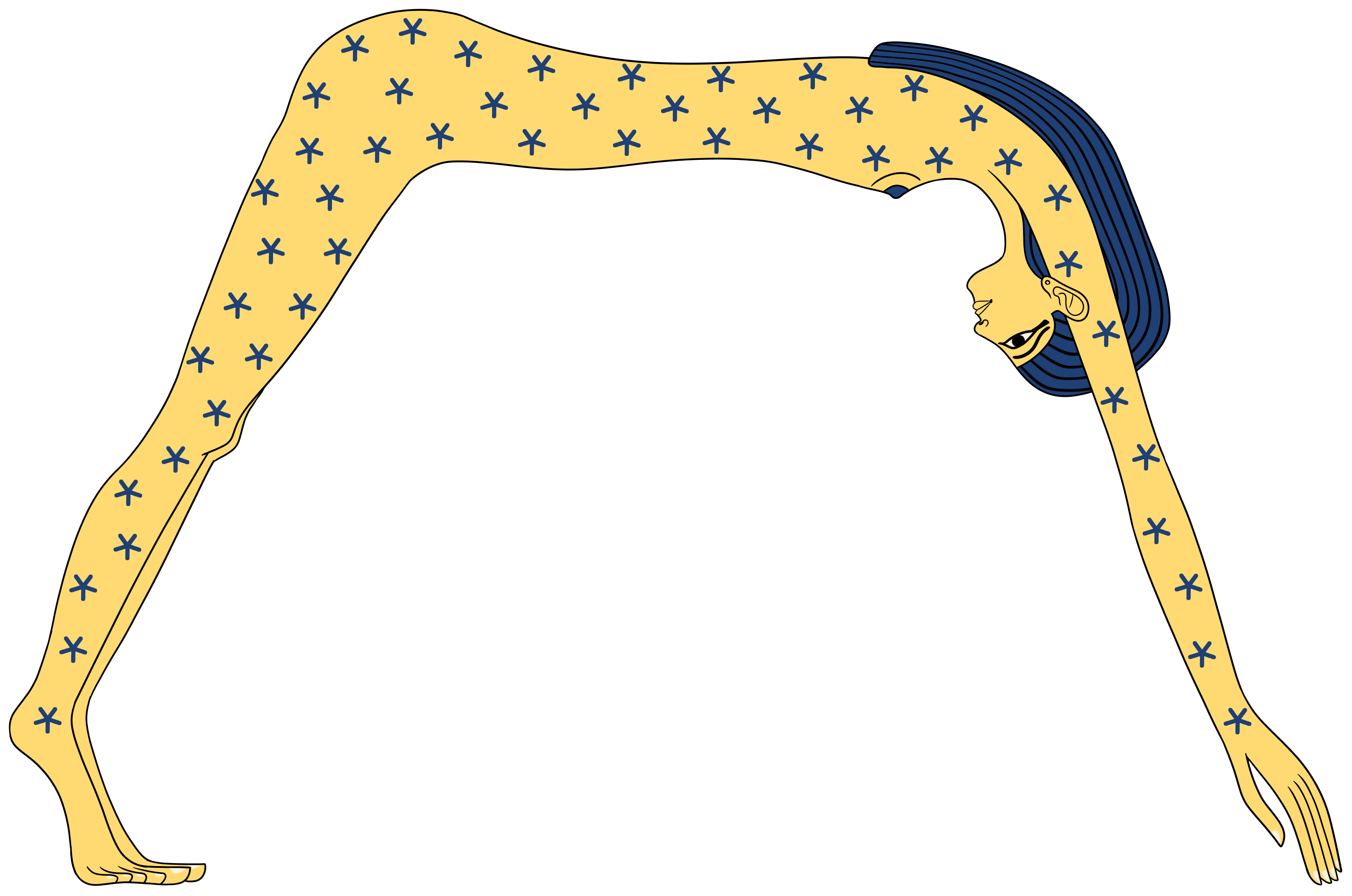
Nut depicted as an arched woman with stars on her body

When not in this position, Nut frequently appeared in ancient Egyptian art as a woman with a water pot (nw) above her head, a symbol that also appeared in the hieroglyphic spelling of her name. She was also depicted as a cow whose great body formed the sky and heavens,a bee, a sycamore tree, or a giant sow suckling many piglets (representing the stars). Statuettes and amulets depicting Nut as a nursing sow appeared in the Third Intermediate Period; Egyptians likely believed these objects blessed the owner with fertility.

A sacred symbol of Nut was the ladder used by Osiris to enter her heavenly skies. This ladder-symbol was called maqet and was placed in tombs to protect the deceased, and to invoke the aid of the deity of the dead.
