= Nephthys =

Ancient Egyptian goddess

- Nephthys normally portrayed as a young woman, wearing a headdress in the shape of a house and basket
Name in hieroglyphs
O9 t H8
- Major cult center: None specifically, Diospolis Parva
- Symbol: The sacred temple enclosure

Genealogy
- Parents: Geb and Nut
- Siblings: Isis, Osiris, Haroeris, and Set
- Consort: Set, Osiris, Horus, (in some myths) Anubis (in Nubia)
- Offspring: Anubis, Horus (in some myths)

Nephthys or Nebet-Het in ancient Egyptian (Ancient Greek: Νέφθυς) was a goddess in ancient Egyptian religion. A member of the Great Ennead of Heliopolis in Egyptian mythology, she was a daughter of Nut and Geb. Nephthys was typically paired with her sister Isis in funerary rites because of their role as protectresses of the mummy, with her brother Osiris, and as the sister-wife of Set.

She was associated with mourning, the night/darkness, service (specifically temples), childbirth, the dead, protection, magic, health, embalming, and beer.

== Etymology ==
Nephthys is the Greek form of an epithet (transliterated as Nebet-hut, Nebet-het, Nebt-het, from Egyptian nbt-ḥwt). The origin of the goddess Nephthys is unclear but the literal translation of her name is usually given as Lady of the House or Lady of the Temple.

This title, which may be more of an epithet describing her function than a given name, probably indicates the association of Nephthys with one particular temple or some specific aspect of the Egyptian temple ritual. Along with her sister Isis, Nephthys represented the temple pylon or trapezoidal tower gateway entrance to the temple which also displayed the flagstaff. This entrance way symbolized the horizon or akhet.

== Function ==
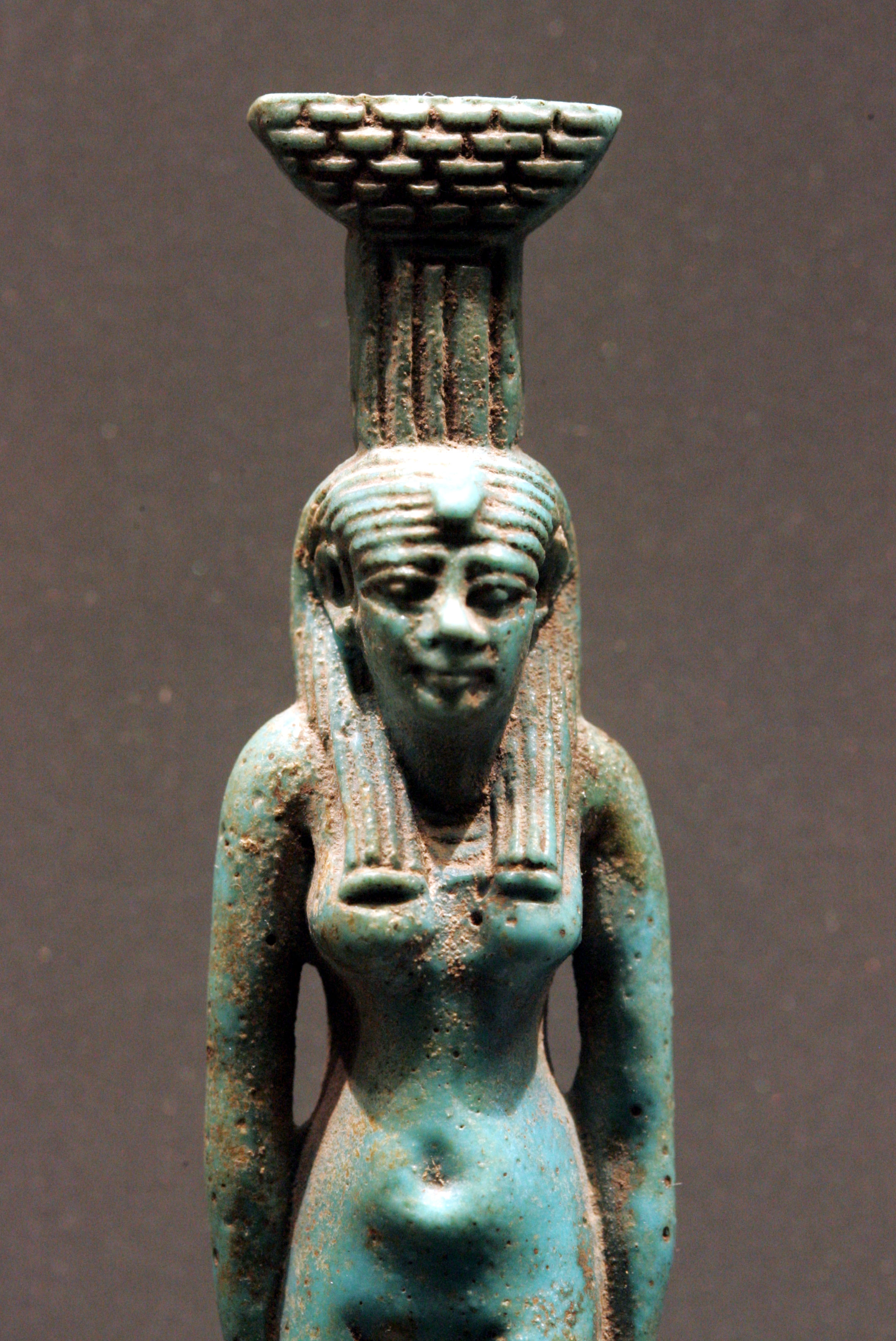
Nephthys – Musée du Louvre, Paris, France

At the time of the Fifth Dynasty Pyramid Texts, Nephthys appears as a goddess of the Heliopolitan Ennead. She is the sister of Isis and companion of the war-like deity, Set. As sister of Isis and especially Osiris, Nephthys is a protective goddess who symbolizes the death experience, just as Isis represents the birth experience. Nephthys was known in some ancient Egyptian temple theologies and cosmologies as the "Helpful Goddess" or the "Excellent Goddess". These late ancient Egyptian temple texts describe a goddess who represents divine assistance and protective guardianship.

Nephthys is regarded as the mother of the funerary deity Anubis (Inpu) in some myths. Alternatively Anubis appears as the son of Bastet or Isis. In Nubia, Nephthys was said to be the wife of Anubis.

Though usually considered the aunt of Horus, she often appears as his mother. She is also seen as a wife of Horus. As the primary "nursing mother" of the incarnate pharaonic god, Horus, Nephthys also was considered to be the nurse of the reigning pharaoh himself. Though other goddesses could assume this role, Nephthys was most usually portrayed in this function. In contrast, Nephthys is sometimes featured as a rather ferocious and dangerous divinity, capable of incinerating the enemies of the pharaoh with her fiery breath.

New Kingdom Ramesside Pharaohs, in particular, were enamored of Mother Nephthys as is attested in various stelae and a wealth of inscriptions at Karnak and Luxor, where Nephthys was a member of that great city's Ennead and her altars were present in the massive complex.

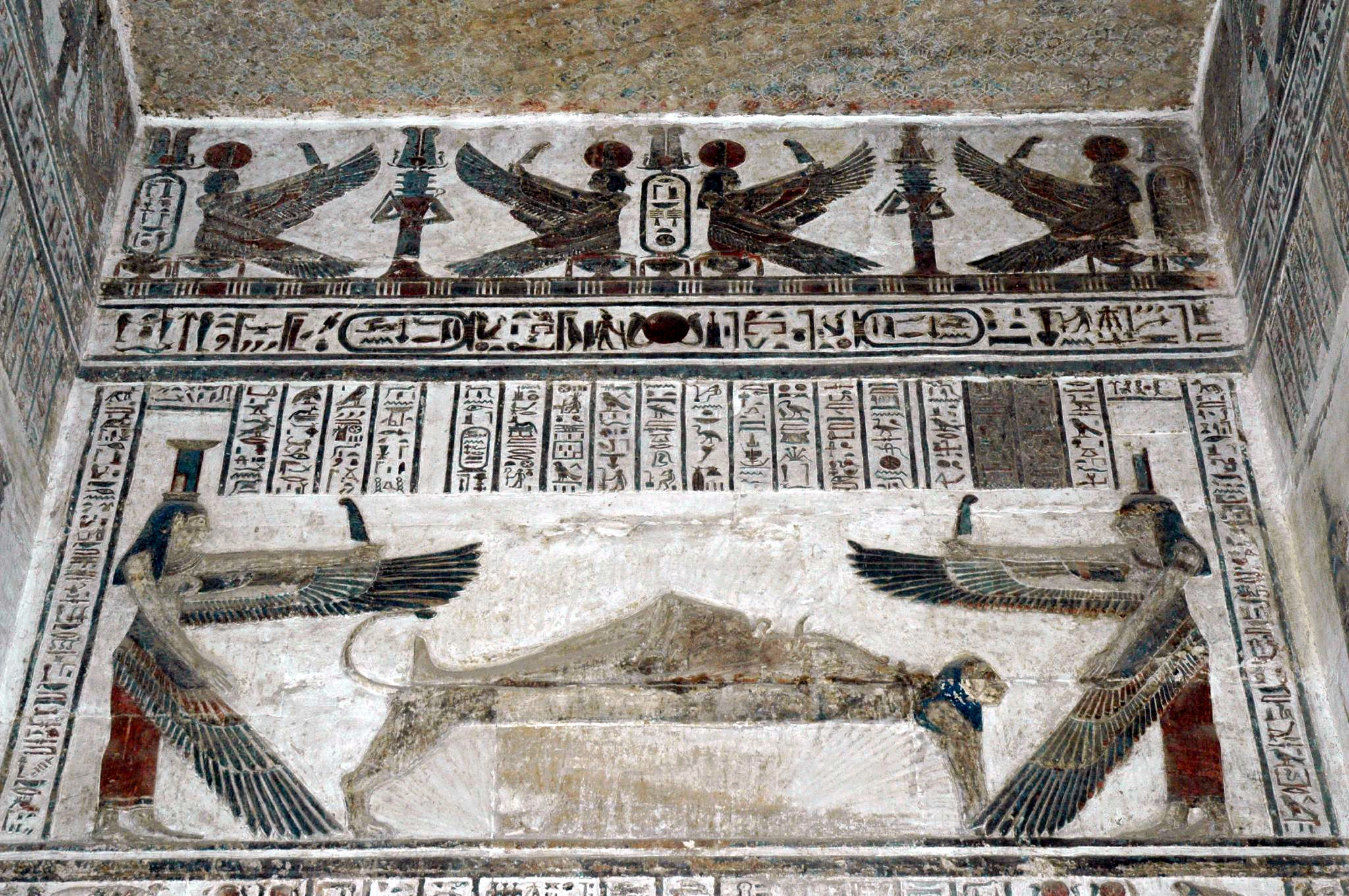
Temple decoration at Dendera, depicting the goddesses Isis and Nephthys watching over the corpse of their brother Osiris

Nephthys was typically paired with her sister Isis in funerary rites because of their role as protectors of the mummy and the god Osiris and as the sister-wife of Set. Less well understood than her sister Isis, Nephthys was no less important in Egyptian religion as confirmed by the work of E. Hornung along with the work of several noted scholars.

Ascend and descend; descend with Nephthys, sink into darkness with the Night-bark. Ascend and descend; ascend with Isis, rise with the Day-bark.
— Pyramid Text utterance 222, line 210

== Symbolism ==
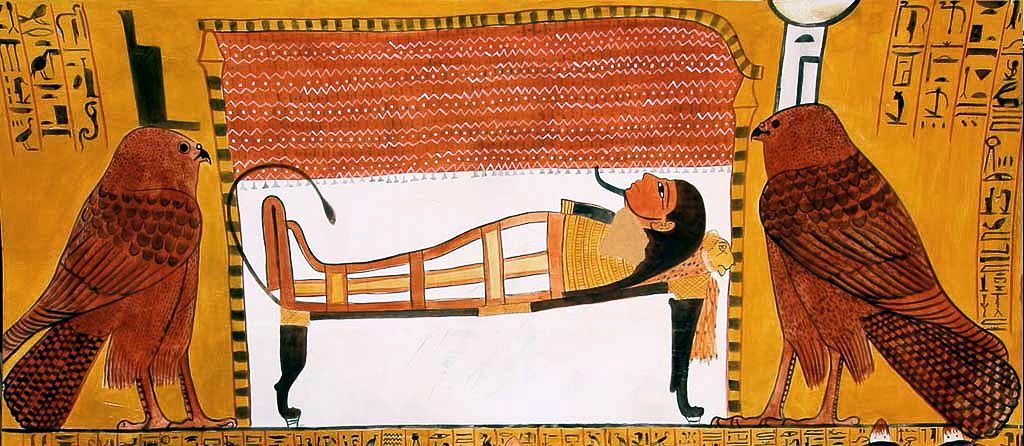
Isis (left) and Nephthys (right) as kites near the bier of a mummy, thirteenth century BCE

In the funerary role, Nephthys often was depicted as a kite or as a woman with falcon wings, usually outstretched as a symbol of protection. Nephthys's association with the kite or the Egyptian hawk (and its piercing, mournful cries) evidently reminded the ancients of the lamentations usually offered for the dead by wailing women. In this capacity, it is easy to see how Nephthys could be associated with death and putrefaction in the Pyramid Texts. She was, almost without fail, depicted as crowned by the hieroglyphs signifying her name, which were a combination of signs for the sacred temple enclosure (ḥwt) along with the sign for nb or mistress (lady) on top of the enclosure sign.

Nephthys was clearly viewed as a morbid-but-crucial force of heavenly transition, i.e., the pharaoh becomes strong for his journey to the afterlife through the intervention of Isis and Nephthys. The same divine power could be applied later to all of the dead, who were advised to consider Nephthys a necessary companion. According to the Pyramid Texts, Nephthys, along with Isis, was a force before whom demons trembled in fear and whose magical spells were necessary for navigating the various levels of Duat, as the region of the afterlife was termed.

== Mythology and position in the pantheon ==
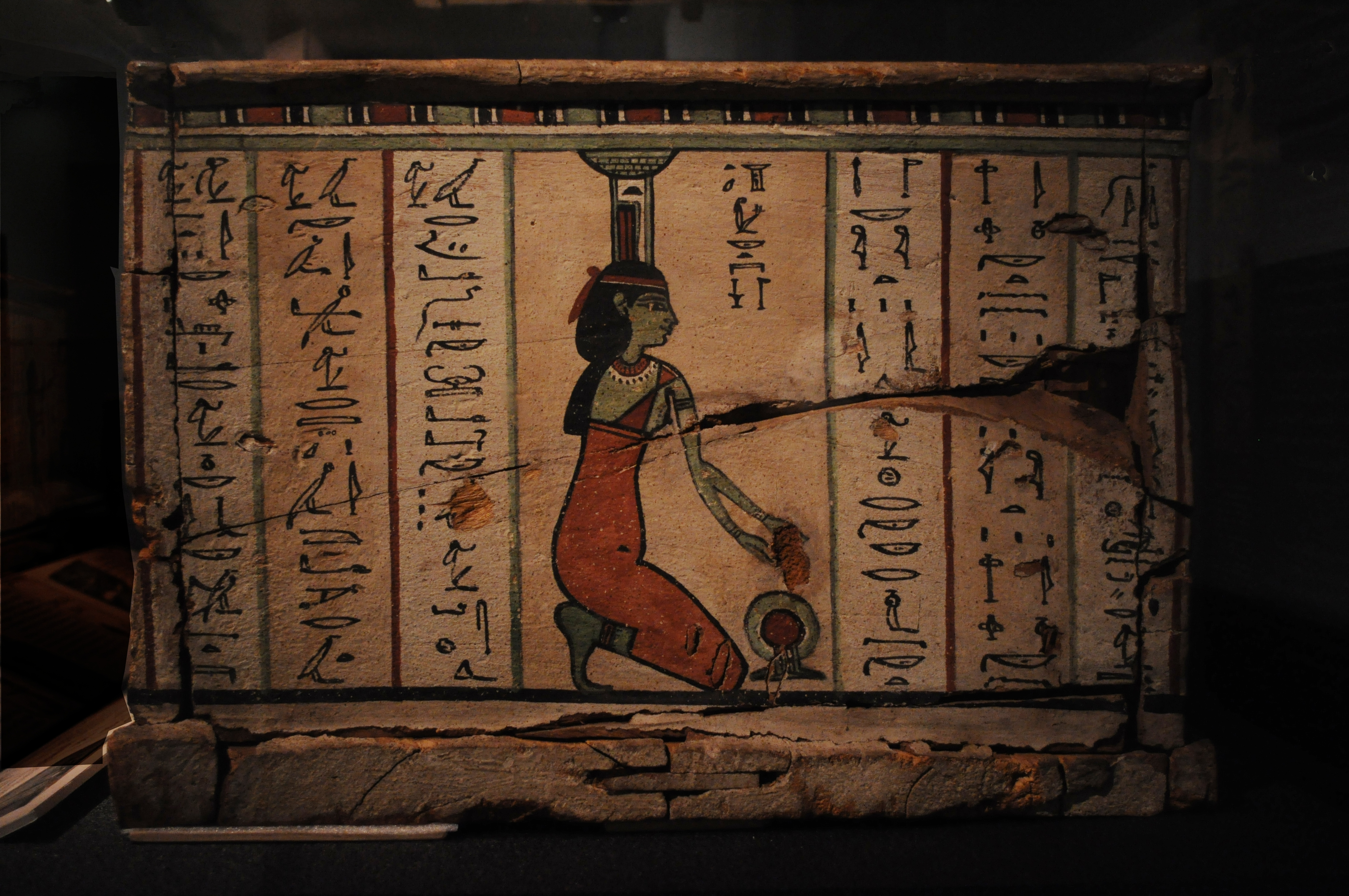
Nephthys on the outer coffin of Ankh-Wennefer

Though it commonly has been assumed that Nephthys was married to Set and they have a son Anubis, recent Egyptological research has called this into question. Levai notes that while Plutarch's De Iside et Osiride mentions the deities' marriage, there is very little specifically linking Nephthys and Set in the original early Egyptian sources. She argues that the later evidence suggests that:

while Nephthys's marriage to Set was a part of Egyptian mythology, it was not a part of the myth of the murder and resurrection of Osiris. She was not paired with Set the villain, but with Set's other aspect, the benevolent figure who was the killer of Apophis. This was the aspect of Set worshiped in the western oases during the Roman period, where he is depicted with Nephthys as co-ruler.

One of the few sources that explicitly identify Nephthys as the wife of Set within the context of the Osiris myth is Papyrus Berlin P. 8278. This text recounts an episodic part of the Osiris myth in which the men of Set and Horus engage in a military conflict, ultimately leading to Set’s expulsion from Egypt. After consuming the Eye of Horus and becoming intoxicated by it, Set attempts to anally penetrate Nephthys before being discovered by the gods and accused of murdering Osiris. Rather than responding to the accusations made by Isis or Thoth, Set instead laments that the gods have separated him from Nephthys, whom he refers to as the "female donkey," just as he had grabbed her by the tail and was about to penetrate her—insisting that she rightfully belonged to him as his wife.

It is Nephthys who assists Isis in gathering and mourning the dismembered portions of the body of Osiris after his murder by the envious Set. Nephthys also serves as the nursemaid and watchful guardian of the infant Horus. The Pyramid Texts refer to Isis as the "birth-mother" and to Nephthys as the "nursing-mother" of Horus. Nephthys was attested as one of the four "Great Chiefs" ruling in the Osirian cult center of Busiris in the Delta and she appears to have occupied an honorary position at the holy city of Abydos. No cult is attested for her there, though she certainly figured as a goddess of great importance in the annual rites conducted, wherein two chosen females or priestesses played the roles of Isis and Nephthys and performed the elaborate "Lamentations of Isis and Nephthys". There, at Abydos, Nephthys joined Isis as a mourner in the shrine known as the Osireion. These "Festival Songs of Isis and Nephthys" were ritual elements of many such Osirian rites in major ancient Egyptian cult centers.

As a mortuary goddess like Isis, Neith, and Serqet, Nephthys was one of the protectresses of the canopic jars of Hapi. Hapi, one of the sons of Horus, guarded the embalmed lungs. Thus we find Nephthys endowed with the epithet "Nephthys of the Bed of Life" in direct reference to her regenerative priorities on the embalming table. In the city of Memphis, Nephthys was duly honored with the title "Queen of the Embalmer's Shop" and there associated with the jackal-headed god Anubis as patron.

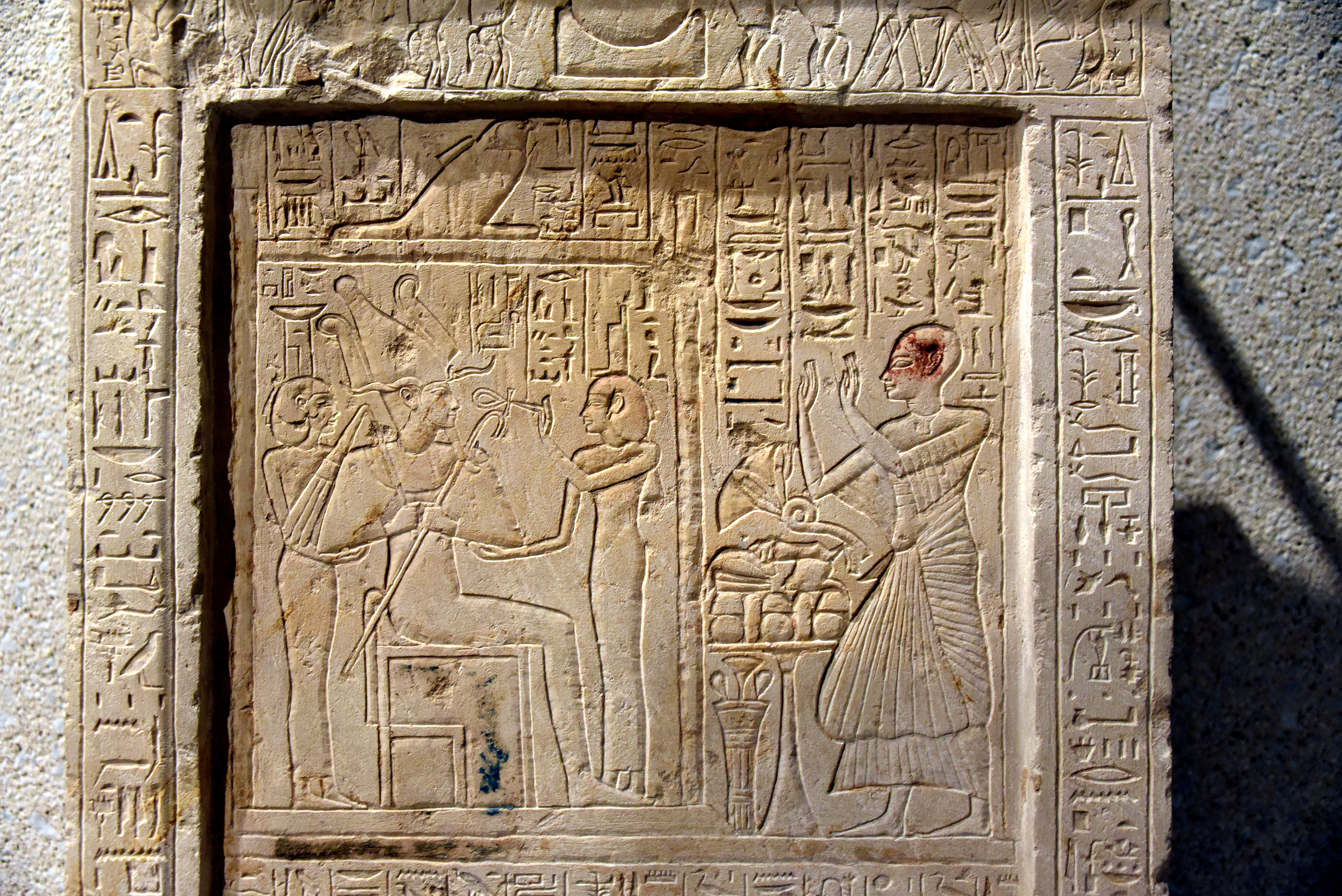
Detail, Funerary stele of Seba. Osiris is flanked by Isis and Nephthys. New Kingdom, c. 1250 BCE. From Memphis, Egypt. Neues Museum, Berlin

Nephthys was also considered a festive deity whose rites could mandate the liberal consumption of beer. In various reliefs at Edfu, Dendera, and Behbeit, Nephthys is depicted receiving lavish beer offerings from the pharaoh which she would "return" using her power as a beer goddess "that [the pharaoh] may have joy with no hangover". Elsewhere at Edfu, for example, Nephthys is a goddess who gives the pharaoh power to see "that which is hidden by moonlight". This fits well with more general textual themes that consider Nephthys to be a goddess whose unique domain was darkness or the perilous edges of the desert.

Nephthys could also appear as one of the goddesses who assists at childbirth. An ancient Egyptian myth preserved in the Papyrus Westcar recounts the story of Isis, Nephthys, Meskhenet, and Heqet as traveling dancers in disguise, assisting the wife of a priest of Amun-Re as she prepares to bring forth sons who are destined for fame and fortune.

Nephthys's healing skills and status as direct counterpart of Isis, steeped as her sister in "words of power", are evidenced by the abundance of faience amulets carved in her likeness and by her presence in a variety of magical papyri that sought to summon her famously altruistic qualities to the aid of mortals.

== New Kingdom cults ==
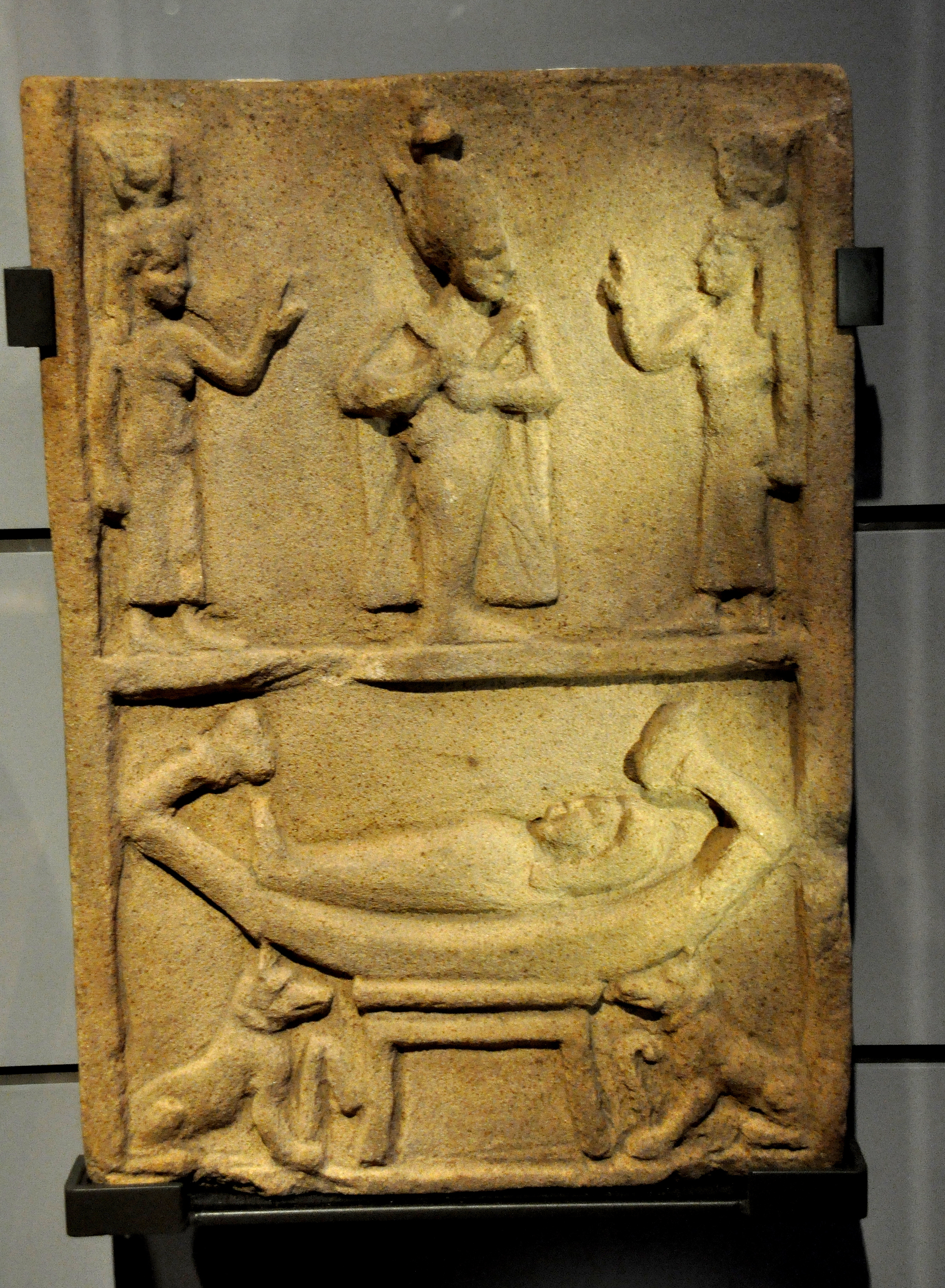
A mummy rests on a sacred boat guarded by Anubis. Above, figures of Osiris, Isis, and Nephthys. Sandstone stela. From Egypt, 332 BCE to 395 CE. Kelvingrove Art Gallery and Museum, Glasgow, UK

The Ramesside pharaohs were particularly devoted to Set's prerogatives and, in the 19th Dynasty, a temple of Nephthys called the "House of Nephthys of Ramesses-Meriamun" was built or refurbished in the town of Sepermeru, midway between Oxyrhynchus and Herakleopolis, on the outskirts of the Fayyum and quite near to the modern site of Deshasheh. Here, as Papyrus Wilbour notes in its wealth of taxation records and land assessments, the temple of Nephthys was a specific foundation by Ramesses II, located in close proximity to (or within) the precinct of the enclosure of Set. To be certain, the House of Nephthys was one of fifty individual, land-owning temples delineated for this portion of the Middle Egyptian district in Papyrus Wilbour. The fields and other holdings belonging to Nephthys's temple were under the authority of two Nephthys prophets (named Penpmer and Merybarse) and one (mentioned) wa'ab priest of the goddess.

While certainly affiliated with the "House of Set", the Nephthys temple at Sepermeru and its apportioned lands (several acres) clearly were under administration distinct from the Set institution. The Nephthys temple was a unique establishment in its own right, an independent entity. According to Papyrus Wilbour, another "House of Nephthys of Ramesses-Meriamun" seems to have existed to the north, in the town of Su, closer to the Fayyum region.

Another temple of Nephthys seems to have existed in the town of Punodjem. The Papyrus Bologna records a complaint lodged by a prophet of the temple of Set in that town regarding undue taxation in his regard. After making an introductory appeal to "Re-Horakhte, Set, and Nephthys" for the ultimate resolution of this issue by the royal Vizier, the prophet (named Pra'emhab) laments his workload. He notes his obvious administration of the "House of Set" and adds: "I am also responsible for the ship, and I am responsible likewise for the House of Nephthys, along with a heap of other temples."

As "Nephthys of Ramesses-Meriamun", the goddess and her shrines were under the particular endorsement of Ramesses II. The foundations of the Set and Nephthys temples at Sepermeru finally were discovered and identified in the 1980s and the Nephthys temple was a self-sustaining temple complex within the Set enclosure.

There can be little doubt that a cult of Nephthys existed in the temple and great town of Herakleopolis, north of Sepermeru. A near life-sized statue of Nephthys (currently housed in the Louvre) boasts a curiously altered inscription. The basalt image originally was stationed at Medinet-Habu as part of the cultic celebration of the pharaonic "Sed-Festival", but was transferred at some point to Herakleopolis and the temple of Herishef. The cult-image's inscription originally pertained to "Nephthys, Foremost of the Sed [Festival] in the Booth of Annals" (at Medinet-Habu), but was re-inscribed or re-dedicated to "Nephthys, Foremost of the [Booths of] Herakleopolis". A "prophet of Nephthys" is indeed attested for the town of Herakleopolis in the 30th Dynasty.

== Chief goddess of Nome VII ==
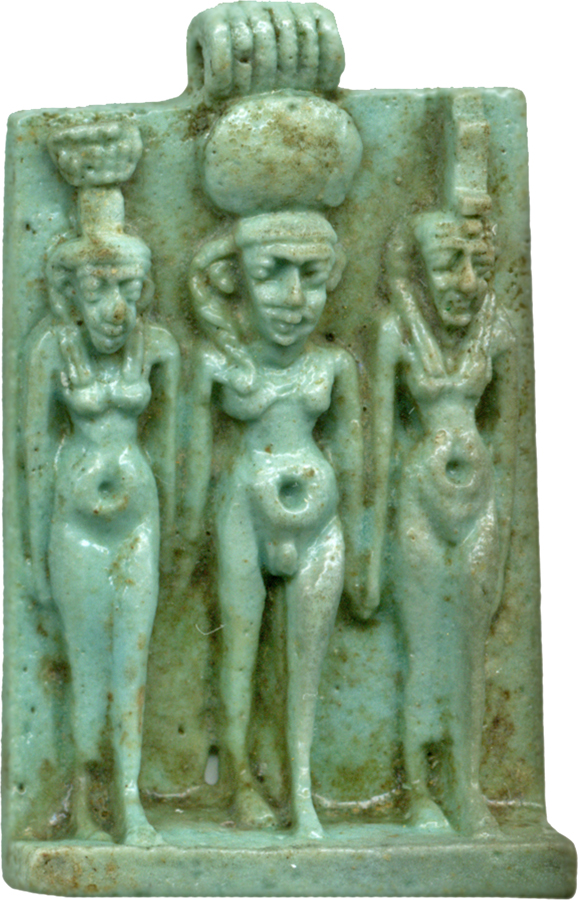
Triad of Isis, Nephthys, and Harpocrates. Early Greco-Roman. Walters Museum

Nephthys was considered the unique protectress of the Bennu bird. This role may have stemmed from an early association in her native Heliopolis which was renowned for its "House of the Bennu" temple. In this role, Nephthys was given the name "Nephthys-Kheresket" and a wealth of temple texts from Edfu, Dendera, Philae, Kom Ombo, El Qa'la, Esna, and others corroborate the late identification of Nephthys as the supreme goddess of Upper Egyptian Nome VII, where another shrine existed in honor of the Bennu. Nephthys also was the goddess of the "Mansion of the Sistrum" in Hwt-Sekhem (Gr. Diospolis Parva), the chief city of Nome VII. There, Nephthys was the primary protectress of the resident Osirian relic, of the Bennu Bird, and of the local Horus/Osiris manifestation, the god Neferhotep.

Nephthys was most widely and usually worshiped in ancient Egypt as part of a consortium of temple deities. Therefore, it should not be surprising that her cult images could likely be found as part of the divine entourage in temples at Kharga, Kellis, Deir el-Hagar, Koptos, Dendera, Philae, Sebennytos, Busiris, Shenhur, El Qa'la, Letopolis, Heliopolis, Abydos, Thebes, Dakleh Oasis, and indeed throughout Egypt. In most cases, Nephthys found her typical place as part of a triad alongside Osiris and Isis, Isis and Horus, Isis and Min, or as part of a quartet of deities.

== See also ==
- Hapi (Son of Horus)
- 287 Nephthys
