= Khonsu =

Ancient Egyptian god of the moon

- Khonsu in falcon form, adorned with the moon disk and crescent moon.
Name in hieroglyphs
Aa1 N35 M23 G43
- Major cult center: Thebes
- Symbol: the moon disk, the sidelock, falcon, crook and flail, was-scepter
- Parents: Amun and Mut

Khonsu (Ancient Egyptian: ḫnsw; also transliterated as Chonsu, Khonshu, Khensu, Khons, Chons; Coptic: Ϣⲟⲛⲥ, romanized: Shons) is an ancient Egyptian god of the Moon. His name means 'traveller', and this may relate to the perceived nightly travel of the Moon across the sky. Along with Thoth, he marked the passage of time and is associated with baboons. Khonsu was instrumental in the creation of new life in all living creatures. At Thebes, he formed part of a family triad (the "Theban Triad") with Mut his mother and Amun his father.

== Attributes ==
Painting depicting Khonsu in the tomb of Montuherkhepeshef, Valley of the Kings, western Thebes

Khonsu, the ancient Egyptian moon-god, was depicted either as a falcon wearing the moon-disk on his head (left) or as a human child with either green (middle) or blue (right) skin color

In art, Khonsu is typically depicted as a mummy with the symbol of childhood, a sidelock of hair, as well as the menat necklace with crook and flail. He has close links to other divine children such as Horus and Shu. He was also portrayed with the head of a falcon and like Horus, with whom he is associated as a protector and healer, adorned with the moon disk and crescent moon.

Khonsu is mentioned in the Pyramid Texts and Coffin Texts, in which he is depicted in a fierce aspect, but he does not rise to prominence until the New Kingdom, when he is described as the "Greatest God of the Great Gods". Most of the construction of the temple complex at Karnak was centered on Khonsu during the Ramesside period. The Temple of Khonsu at Karnak is in a relatively good state of preservation, and on one of the walls is depicted a creation myth in which Khonsu is described as the great snake who fertilizes the Cosmic Egg in the creation of the world.

Khonsu's reputation as a healer spread outside Egypt; the Bentresh stela records how a princess of Bekhten was instantly cured of an illness upon the arrival of an image of Khonsu. King Ptolemy IV, after he was cured of an illness, called himself "Beloved of Khonsu Who Protects His Majesty and Drives Away Evil Spirits".

Locations of Khonsu's cult were Memphis, Hibis, and Edfu.

== Mythology ==
Khonsu's name means 'traveller' and therefore reflects the fact that the Moon (referred to as Iah in Egyptian) travels across the night sky. He was also referred to by the titles Embracer, Pathfinder, Defender, and Healer; and was thought to watch over those who travel at night. As the god of light in the night, Khonsu was invoked to protect against wild animals, and aid with healing. It was said that when Khonsu caused the crescent moon to shine, women conceived, cattle became fertile, and all nostrils and every throat were filled with fresh air.

=== Role in the underworld ===
The earliest known mention of the god appears in the so-called Cannibal Hymn within the Pyramid Texts. As the butcher of other gods, he is said to extract their entrails and offer them to the deceased king in order to absorb their magical powers. This process was intended to help the deceased king achieve immortality and regain vitality.

In the Cannibal Hymn of the Unas Pyramid, Khonsu is named as a member of a group of demons composed of three unknown deities, whose names can be translated to "The Seizer of Heads," "The One with his head raised," and "The One Above the Redness," as well as the god Shezmu. These five bloodthirsty helpers were placed in the sky, likely based on constellations or other celestial phenomena. Additionally, they are considered messengers of death, sent forth by the deceased.

From the Old Kingdom to the Middle Kingdom, Khonsu is referred to in several tomb inscriptions as a Wepwety (Wpwty), a term often translated as "messenger". This designation refers to underworld deities which were understood as death-bringing spirits and punishers of the deceased.

Further connections to Khonsu and the destruction of heart ceremony can be found in Spell 310 of the Coffin Texts, where he is described as the son of the goddess Shezmetet and tasked with burning hearts with his fiery wrath. Spell 311 of the Coffin Texts aims to help the deceased transform into Khonsu to steal the gods' magical powers and defend against hostile forces. In this context, he is referred to as "Khonsu who lives on hearts." During the New Kingdom period, the role of devourer of hearts was taken over by the goddess Ammit.

=== Role as a moon god ===
Khonsu's connection to the moon traces back to the association of the crescent moon with the ancient Egyptian sickle sword, which Khonsu embodies as an instrument of justice, giving him the epithet "Khonsu the sharp." The earliest indications of Khonsu's lunar attributes appear in Coffin Texts Spells 197 and 195, where the deceased encounters Khonsu returning from Punt. The land of Punt symbolizes the east and the place of the sun's and moon's rising in ancient Egyptian literature.

In the New Kingdom period, the lunar cycle was associated with the phases of life. The crescent moon was also linked to the horns of a bull and became a masculine symbol of fertility. A Ptolemaic inscription from the Khonsu Temple in Thebes describes Khonsu and the sun god as bulls crossing the sky and meeting in the east as "the two illuminators of the heavens". This meeting of the two bulls is theorized to either refer to the arrival of the full moon or the simultaneous presence of the sun and moon in the sky. Here, the crescent moon is portrayed as a young bull; while Khonsu ages into an old, castrated bull during the full before renewing himself at the beginning of the next lunar cycle.

Depictions of Khonsu as a child, or young bull, symbolized the beginning of the lunar cycle and the month's renewal. The rarer depiction of Khonsu as a two-faced child represents the time when the moon is not visible at night. His development from a child to an old man was also applied to the annual cycle, making Khonsu in his youthful manifestation (Khonsu-pa-khered) the bringer of spring and fertility. Inscriptions in his temple in Karnak refer to him as: "the first great [son] of Amun, the beautiful youth; who maketh himself young in Thebes in the form of Ra, the son of the goddess Nubit. A child in the morning, an old man in the evening, a youth at the beginning of the year; who cometh as a child after he had become infirm, and who reneweth his births like the Disk.”

In the Temple of Edfu, the "Complex of Khonsu" contains the "Chamber of the Leg," dedicated to Khonsu. His association with the leg originates from the Osiris myth, in which Osiris' leg was found and preserved in Edfu. Thus, Khonsu is referred to in Edfu as the "Son of the Leg."

Khonsu and Osiris were also equated in the Temple of the Goddess Ipet, located next to the Khonsu Temple in Karnak. In the Ipet Temple, Amun was worshiped as the sun god and son of the goddess Ipet-Nut. As a part of a mythical journey, the sun was said to die daily and enter the underworld as the god Osiris and become Khonsu when it is reborn at dawn.

According to Ptolemaic Egyptian legends, Thebes was the first city in Egypt, founded by Osiris and named after his mother, the sky goddess Nut. This connection is a play on the ancient Egyptian word for city ("niwt"). For this reason, in Ptolemaic inscriptions, Thebes is referred to as the heaven itself that houses both the sun (Amun-wer) and the moon (Khonsu).

=== Role as a creator god ===
During the later period of the New Kingdom, Khonsu was also worshipped as a creator god. As such, he was depicted as a man with two falcon heads, vulture wings, and standing on the back of a crocodile. The two heads represent the sun and the moon, while standing on the crocodile symbolizes triumph over the chaotic, primordial forces.

The Khonsu cosmogony, as described in the Khonsu Temple at Karnak, portrays the god as a central figure in the creation of the world. The narrative explains how the god Amun emerged from the Nun as a serpent and deposited his semen into the primordial waters in the form of a falcon egg. Khonsu, the second primordial snake and son of Amun, devours the semen and becomes pregnant by it. In the form of a crocodile, Khonsu travels to the primordial mount to cleanse his mouth of the waters of Nun. There, he copulates with the goddess Hathor-in-Benenet. Through their union, the city of Thebes is born, and Khonsu gives birth to the eight gods of the Ogdoad. The Ogdoad then ascends to the Island of Flames, where they create the sun god.

In this cosmogony, Amun is given the epithet “Father of the Fathers of the Ogdoad” and is explicitly not considered part of the group of eight gods, emphasizing his status as the supreme deity. Variants of this epithet found in Thebes include: “Father of the Fathers of the Gods of the First Primeval Time,” “Father of the Fathers Who Created the Gods of the Primeval Time,” and “The Father of the Fathers Who Made the One Who Made You.” Instead of Amun and Amunet, Niau and Niaut form the final divine pair of the Ogdoad in the Khonsu cosmogony.

== Forms of Khonsu ==
=== Khonsu-Neferhotep ===
The primary cult of Khonsu at the Karnak Temple during the New Kingdom centered on his manifestation as Khonsu-Neferhotep. This form of Khonsu may have emerged through syncretism with the deity Neferhotep, who was worshipped in Diospolis Parva. Alternatively, "Neferhotep" might have been an epithet added to Khonsu’s name as early as the Middle Kingdom. Inscriptions frequently attribute additional epithets to this form, including “Khonsu-Neferhotep, Horus-Lord of Joy in Karnak,” “Khonsu-Neferhotep, Lord of Maat on the Great Throne,” and “Khonsu-Neferhotep-in-Thebes.”

Khonsu-Neferhotep is depicted either as a mummified youth or as a falcon-headed adult, often positioned behind Amun in temple imagery. Other representations of Khonsu, such as his form as a baboon, were deliberately excluded from depictions of Khonsu-Neferhotep. This distinction served to separate Khonsu-Neferhotep, the son of Amun, from the broader cult of the mature Khonsu, which existed independently of Amun’s worship. As the firstborn son of Amun and his rightful heir, Khonsu-Neferhotep ranked directly below Amun in the hierarchy of Theban deities. In Theban creation myths, he is regarded as part of the second divine generation—subordinate to Amun but above other gods—and is revered as a co-creator of deities.

Like many of Khonsu’s manifestations, Khonsu-Neferhotep was venerated as a moon god who traversed the night sky on the lunar bark, journeying between the mythical mountains of Bakhu and Manu. In Egyptian cosmology, these mountains were believed to support the heavens and marked the entry and exit points of the underworld.

Khonsu-Neferhotep also held a prominent role as an authoritative and judicial deity. At the Khonsu Temple in Karnak, individuals swore oaths in his name to uphold obligations, such as repaying debts. Family disputes, including cases of divorce and inheritance, were also resolved with oaths sworn in his honor. In some Greek oath formulas, Khonsu was equated with Heracles, reflecting his identification with this figure in the Greco-Roman period. He was also known by his Hellenized name, Kesebaieon.

In his temple at Thebes, Khonsu-Neferhotep’s consort was a local manifestation of the goddess Hathor, referred to as “Hathor within the Benenet.” She was honored with the epithet “the Lady of the Heart of Ra,” a reference to one of Khonsu-Neferhotep’s titles, “the Heart of Ra.” In their primordial aspects, they were also referred to as “Khonsu the Elder” and “Hathor the Elder,” respectively.

=== Khonsu-Thoth ===
Khonsu-Thoth, a syncretic deity merging the lunar aspects of Khonsu and Thoth, was venerated in Edfu, Philae, and Thebes. In the temple of Khonsu in Karnak (also referred to as the Benenet), baboons were housed in a designated district and revered as living embodiments of Khonsu-Thoth. A specialized priesthood cared for these baboons and integrated them into oracle rituals. Khonsu-Thoth played an important role in several Theban rituals like the Theban New Year ritual for the Confirmation of Royal Power, a ceremony to release messenger birds, royal offerings to Iah-Lunus, the ritual burnings of the Thoth festival, a symbolic bull race, and the cosmic coronation of Khonsu-Thoth-Iah. He filled the role of supreme judge and vizier within the Theban pantheon.

The syncretism between Thoth and Khonsu also extended to a fusion of Hathor-within-the-Benenet with Seshat and Maat, the two traditional consorts of Thoth. An ancient text describes them as the "two divine beings originating from Ra": one symbolizing the embodiment of Ra's contemplative heart and the tongue through which the word is spoken, and the other representing creative thought and the divine word, which brings creation into being.

== In popular culture ==
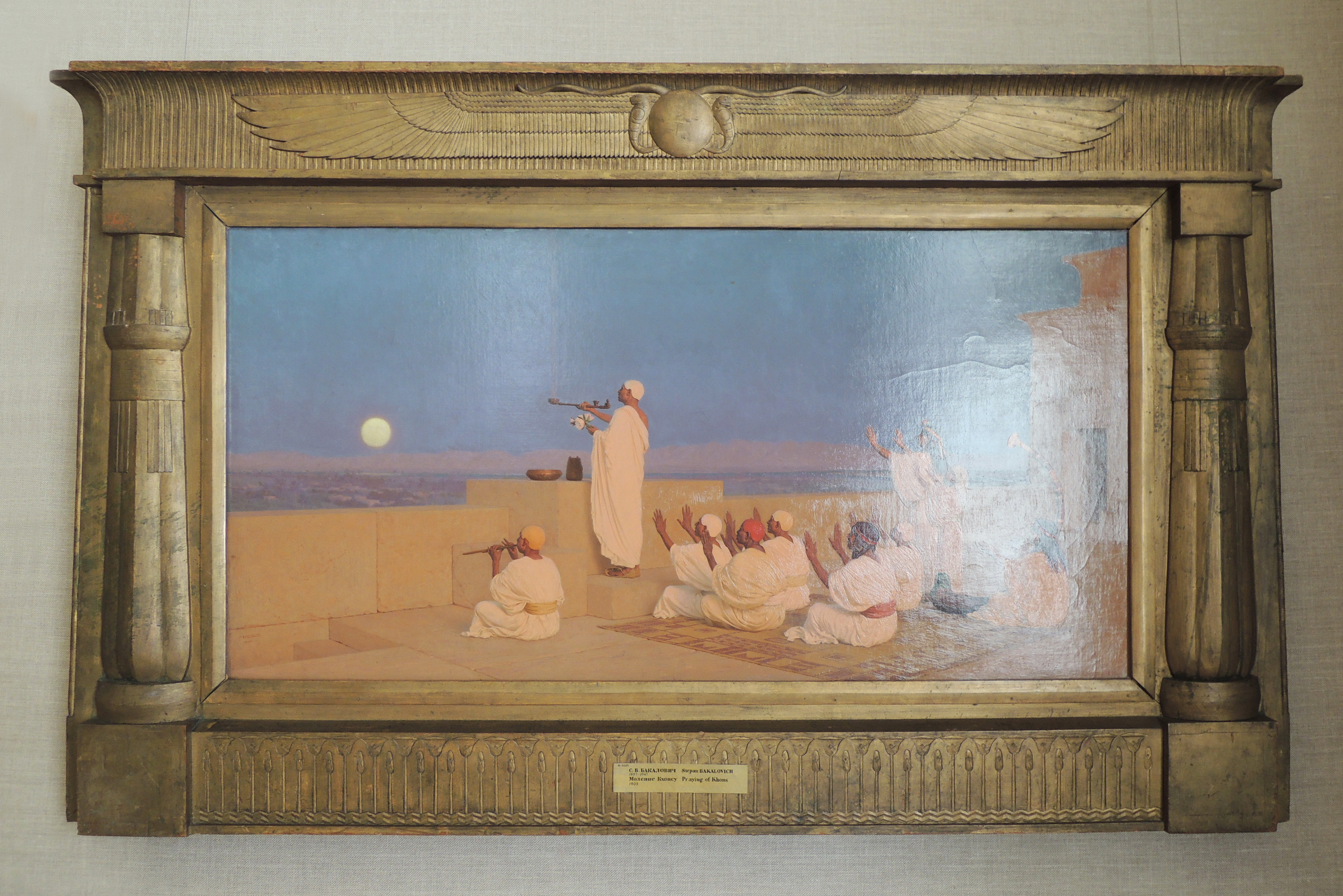
Prayer to Khonsu (1905) by Stefan Bakałowicz, a modern painting depicting priests worshiping Khonsu and the moon

Khonsu appears as a character in Marvel Comics, where the spelling of his name was changed to 'Khonshu'. In the comics, the character Moon Knight is the avatar of Khonshu and is also known as "The Fist of Khonshu". Khonshu grants the protagonist Marc Spector supernatural abilities to fight evil in his name, enhancing his strength, endurance, and reflexes depending upon the phases of the moon; but also slowly drives him insane. Khonshu's nature changes depending on the writer; Doug Moench portrays Khonshu as a neutral figure, but later writers make him more active and malicious. It is often implied that this Khonshu is not a supernatural being at all, but a mental construct of Marc Spector, a hallucination, an alternate or dissociative personality, or a malicious alien parasite. During Volume 2, Moon Knight is given special weapons by the cult of Khonshu. Khonshu also appears in the Marvel Cinematic Universe (MCU) television series Moon Knight, voiced by F. Murray Abraham. In the show Khonshu is shown to prey on Marc's mental issues and his relationships in life to make it so that Marc Spector will fight for him.

In the film series Night at the Museum, Khonsu is the source of the magical Tablet of Ahkmenrah, which brings the museum exhibits to life each night. In the story of Night at the Museum: Secret of the Tomb, the golden tablet was created by the high priest of the temple of Khonsu using Khonsu's magic. The tomb of Ahkmenrah was designed to channel "Khonsu's rays" (moonlight) down to the tablet, rejuvenating its powers every night. If the tablet is away from "Khonsu's light for too long", the exhibits that were brought to life will die.

== Gallery ==
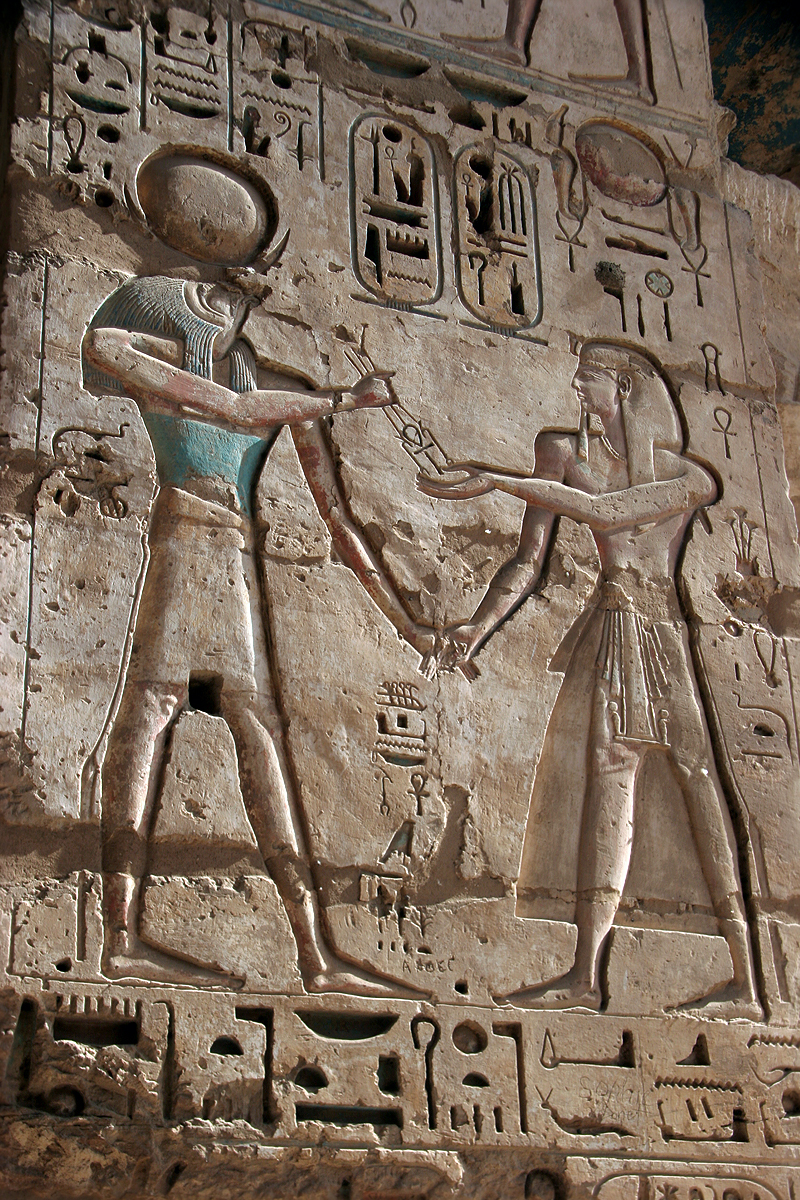
Bas-relief of Khonsu (left) at the mortuary temple of Ramesses III

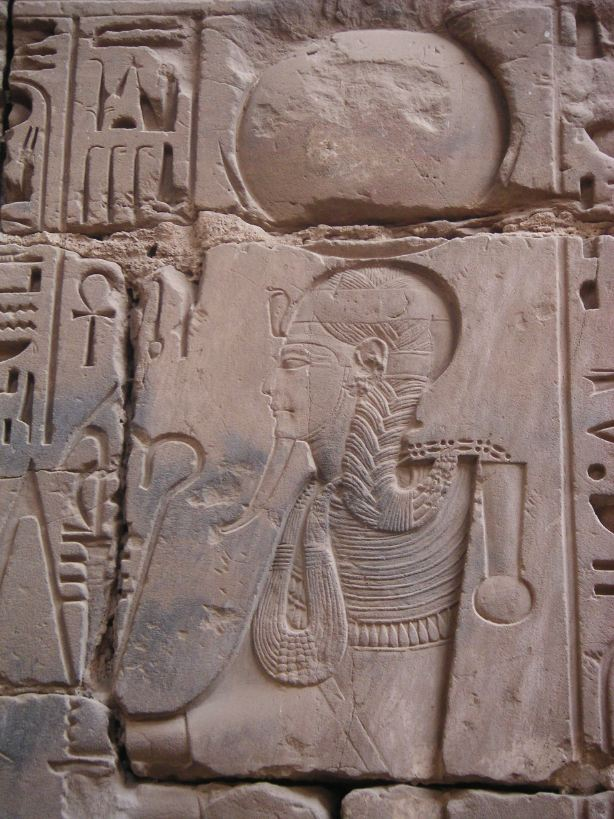

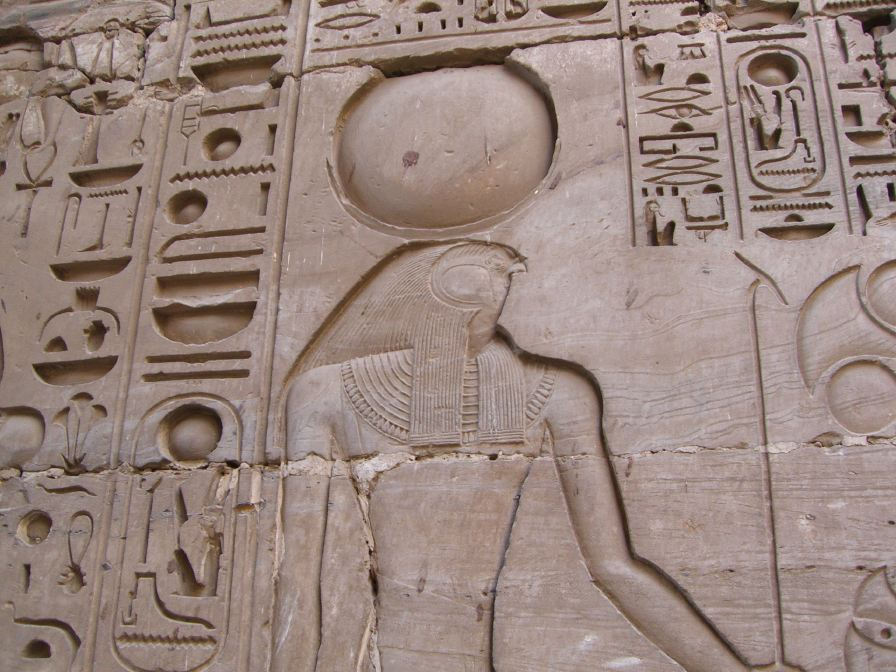
Relief representing Khonsu in the Temple of Khonsu, Karnak, 20th Dynasty

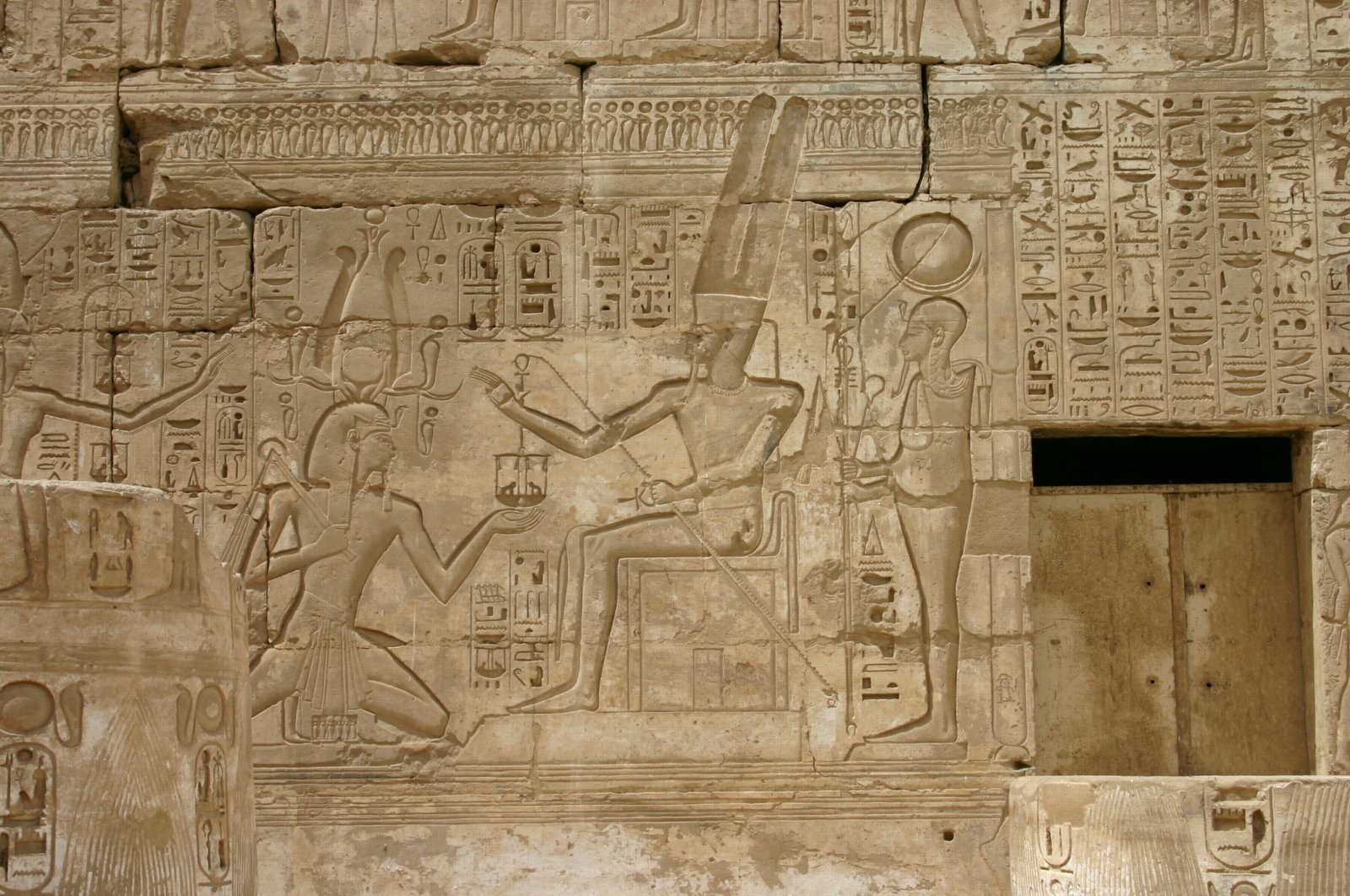
Khonsu behind Rameses III offering to Amun, Temple of a million years of Rameses III

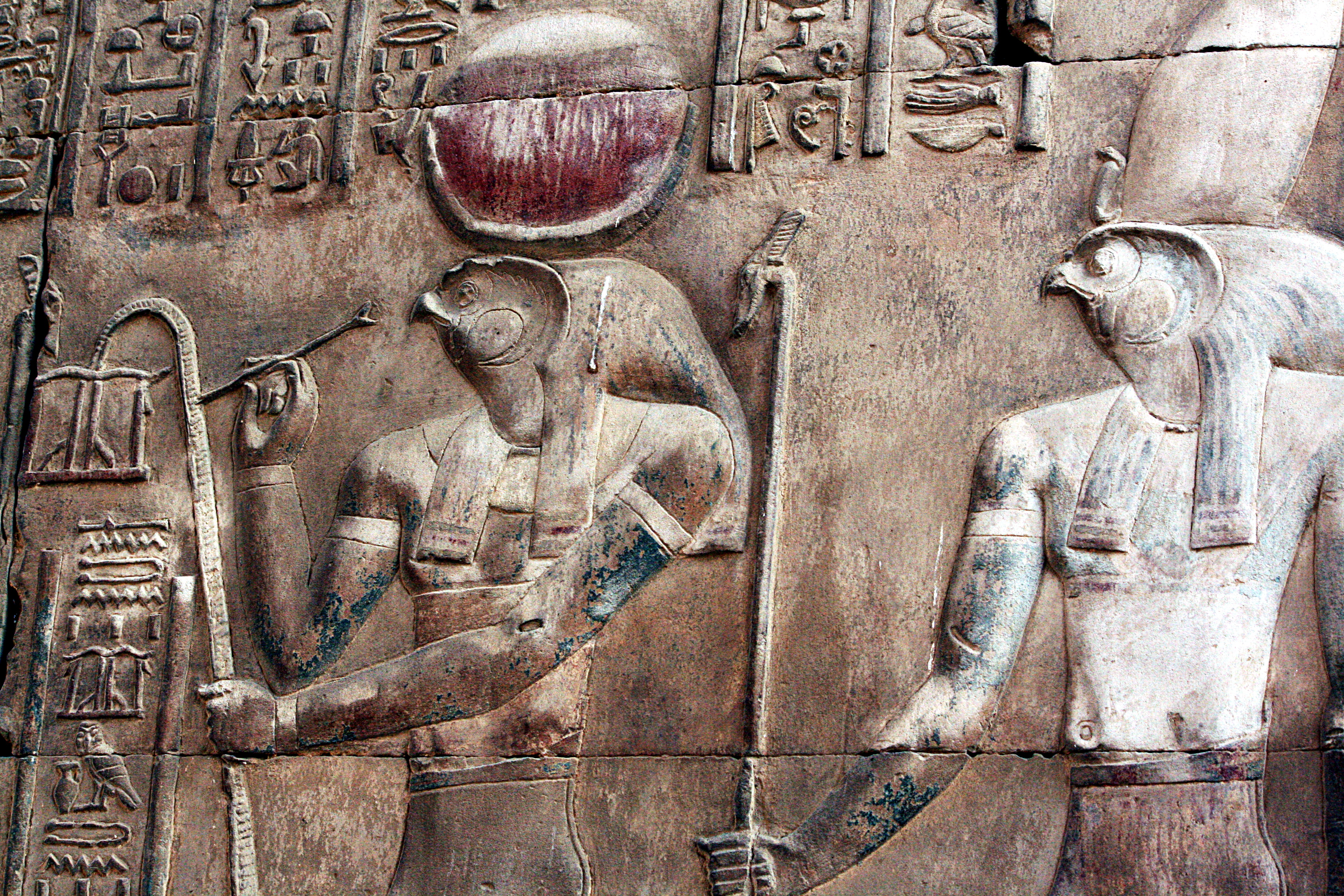
Khonsu depicted in the Temple of Kom Ombo

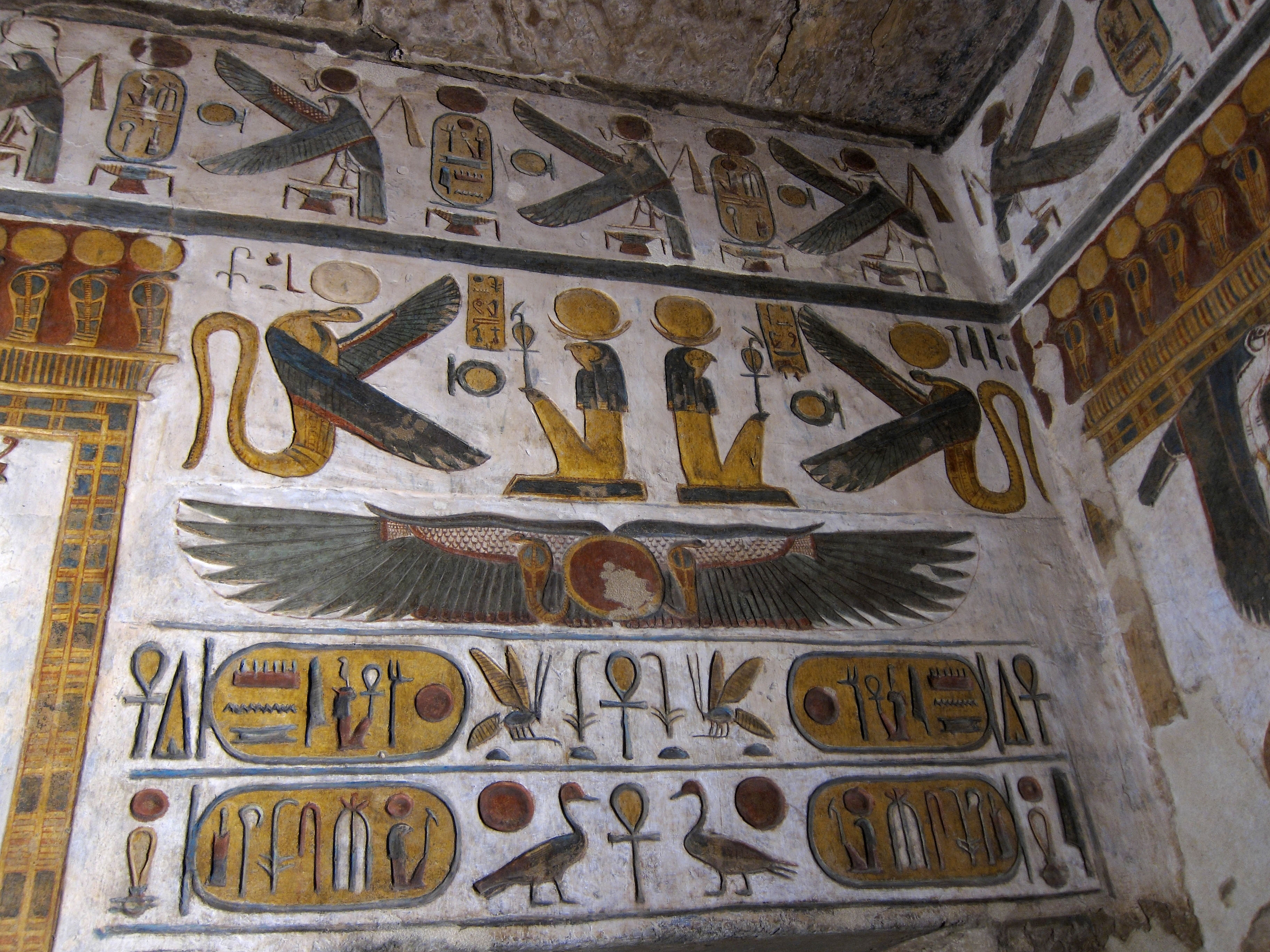
Relief from the Sanctuary of Khonsu Temple in the Precinct of Amun-Re at Karnak Temple

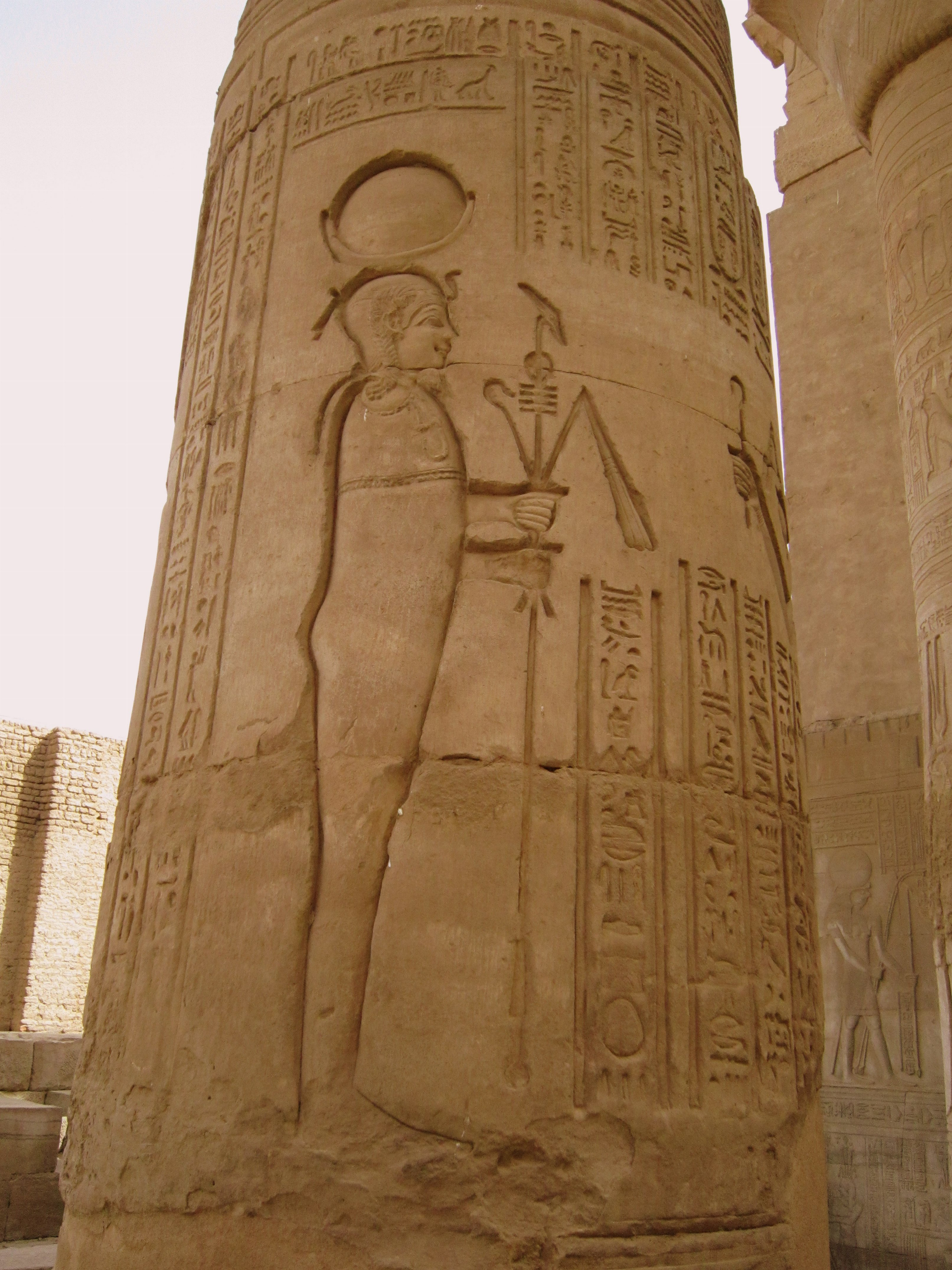
Khonsu depicted in the Temple of Kom Ombo

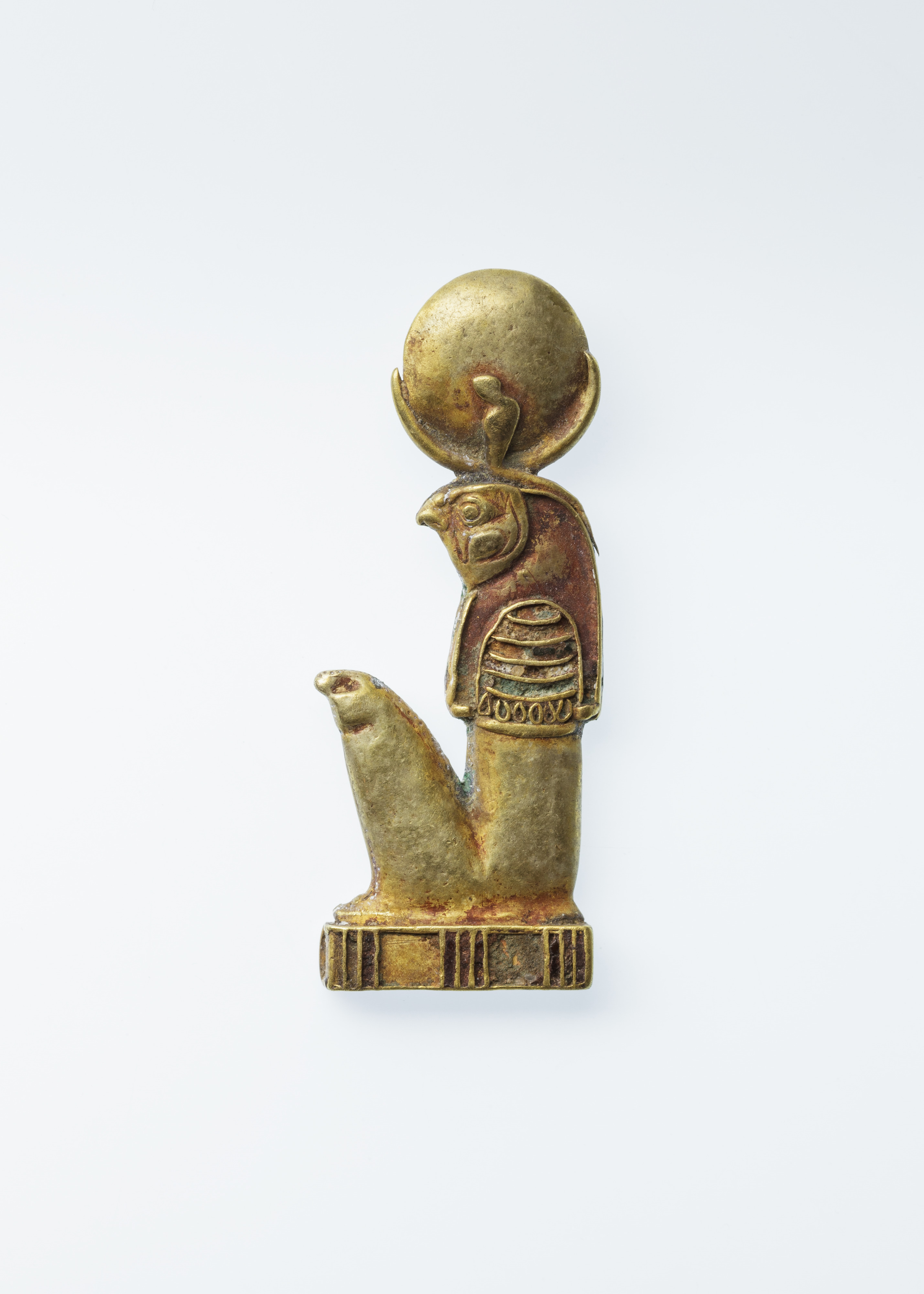
Khonsu pendant

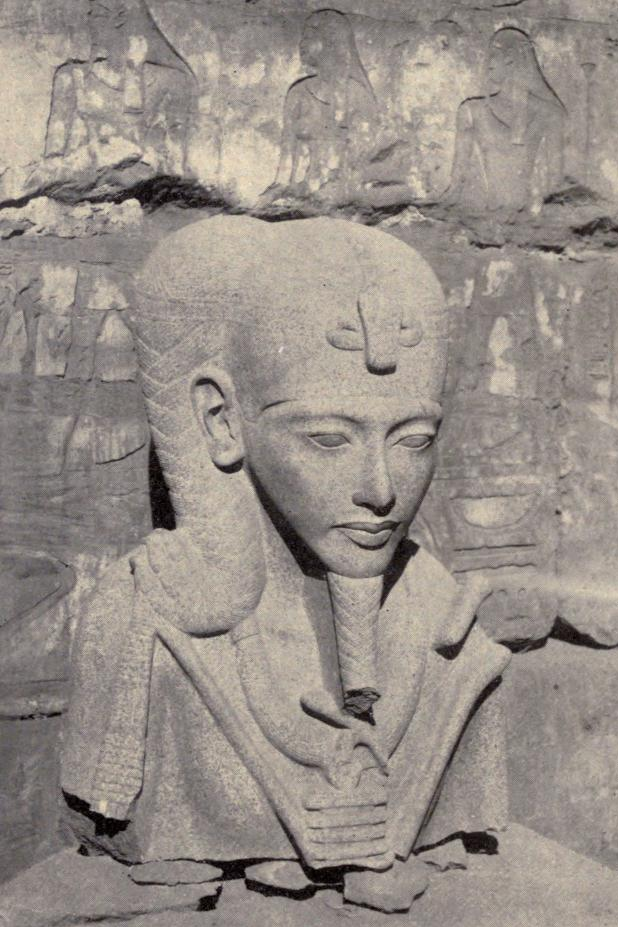
Granite statue of Khonsu, late 18th Dynasty, New Kingdom. Cairo Museum

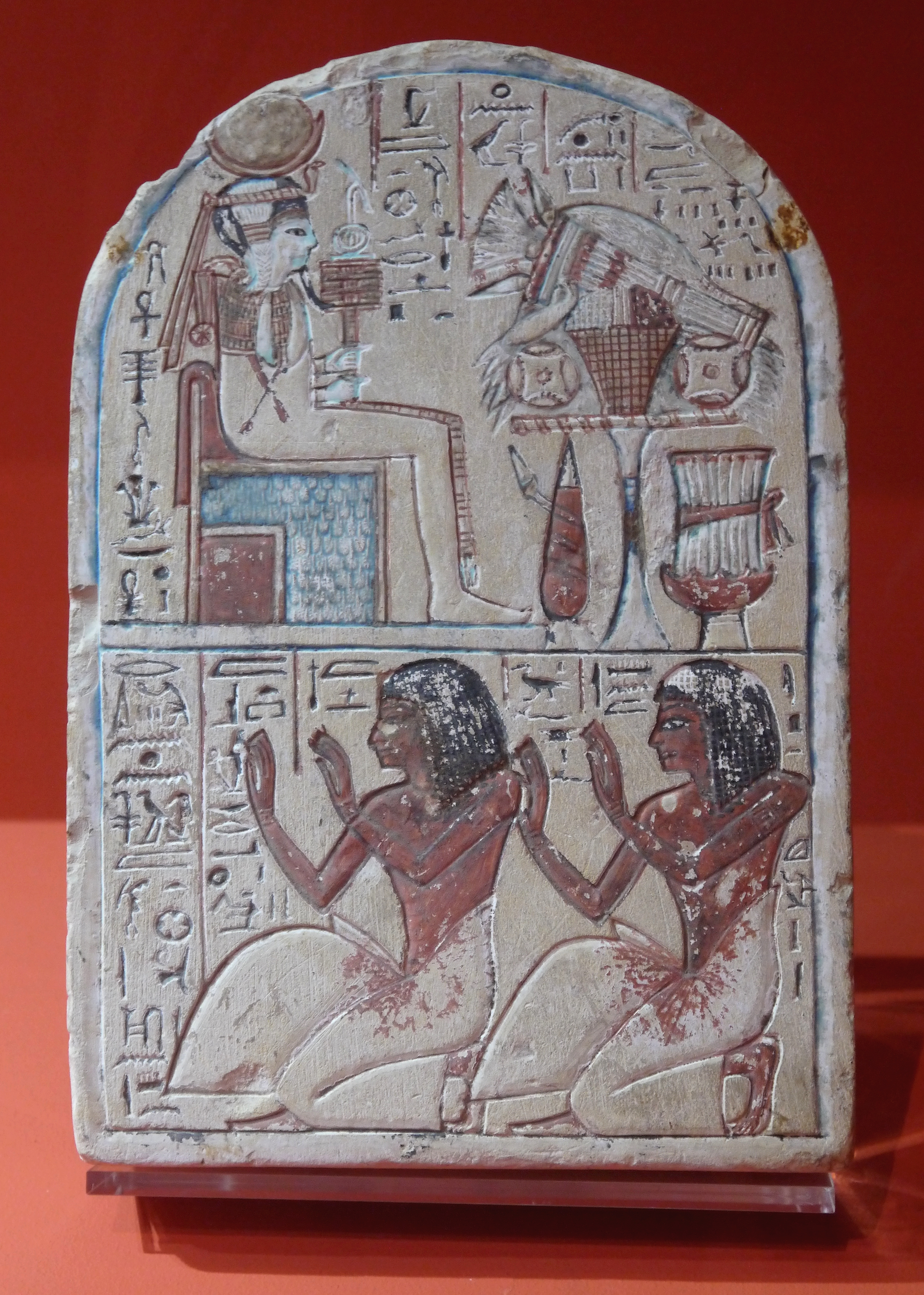
Stele dedicated to Khonsu depicting offerings and worship, Dier-el-Medina, 19th dynasty

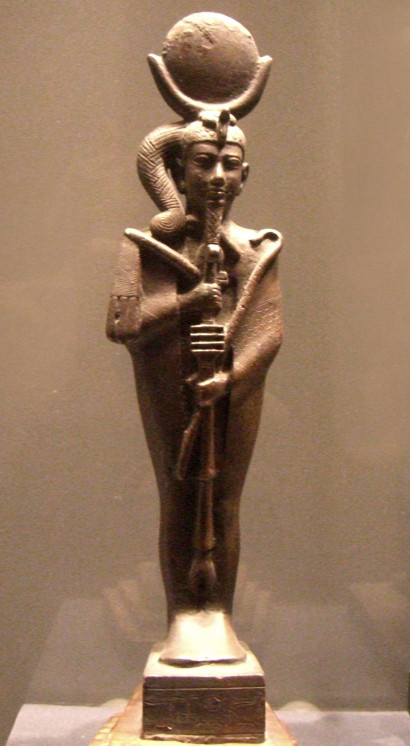
Statue of khonsu from the louvre

== See also ==
- List of lunar deities
- Ra
