= Akhet =

Akhet is a transcription of various Egyptian words.

Akhet may refer to:

- Akhet, the season of the flood in the ancient Egyptian calendar
- Akhet, a hieroglyph, meaning "horizon"
- Akhet, an album by Belgian industrial music band Klinik
