= Wiktoryna Bakałowiczowa =

Polish theater actress

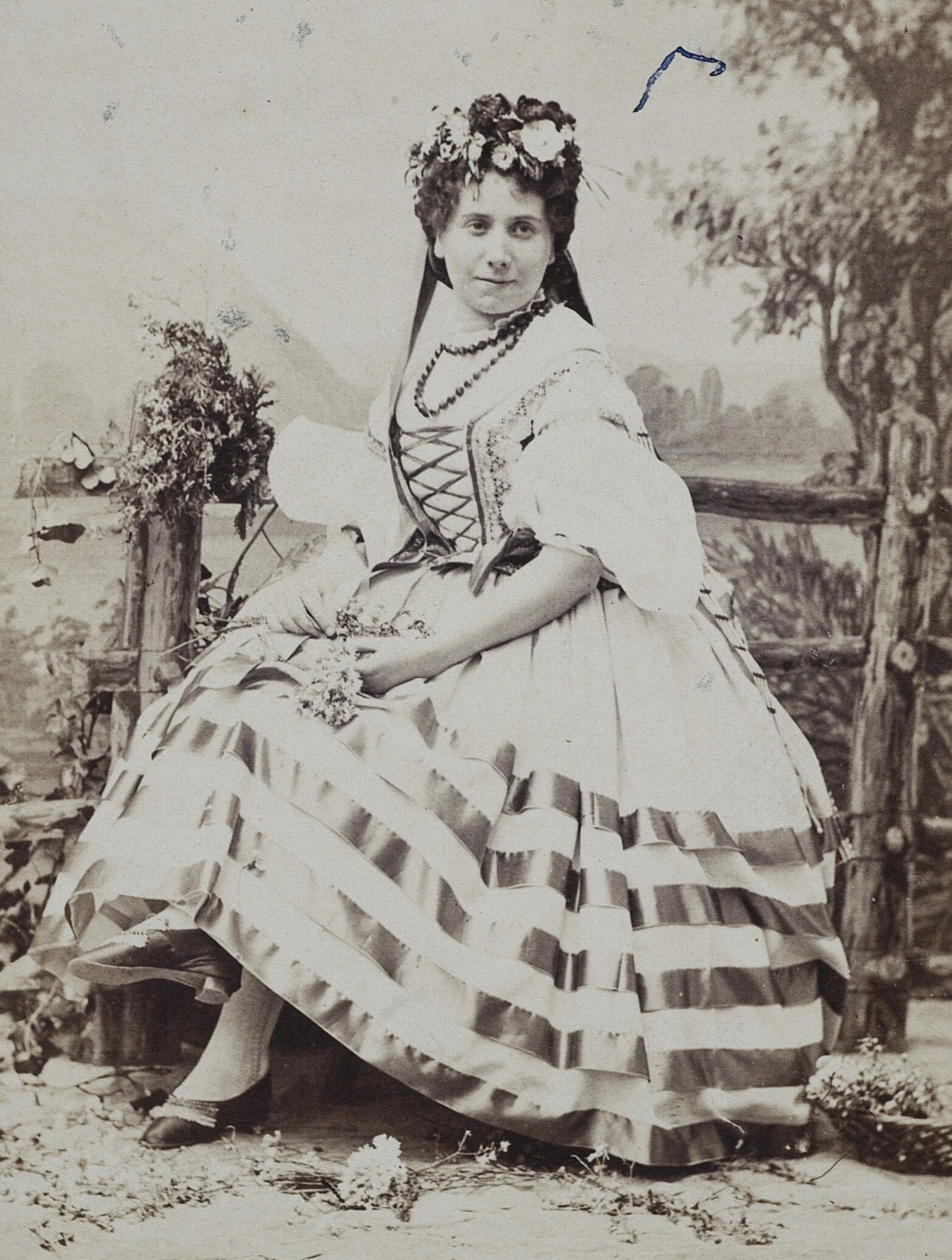
- Photograph by Maksymilian Fajans (c.1871)
- Born: Wiktoryna Józefa Szymanowska; 17 October 1835; Warsaw, Poland
- Died: 30 October 1874 (aged 39); Warsaw, Poland
- Occupation: Actress
- Spouse: Władysław Bakałowicz
- Children: Stefan Bakałowicz

Wiktoryna Józefa Bakałowiczowa, née Szymanowska (17 October 1835 — 30 October 1874) was a Polish theatre actress.

She was an established female actress, who was said to earn as much as 10 rubles per performance.

In 1856, she married the painter Władysław Bakałowicz, and had a son named Stefan Bakałowicz in 1857. He also became a painter.
