= Aker (deity) =

Ancient Egyptian earth and underworld god

- Pictured is Ruty though Aker was often depicted similarly. Twin lions (yesterday and tomorrow) believed to guard the eastern and western horizons as the points where the sun touches the twin-peaked mountain top of the earth where it leaves and re-enters the underworld.
Name in hieroglyphs
A k r
or
A k r E20
- Symbol: Horizon

Aker was an ancient Egyptian personification of the horizon, and an earth and underworld god, believed to guard the eastern (Bakhu) and western (Manu) horizons.

== Description ==
drawing of Aker as two sphinxes merged at the torso

Aker was first depicted as the torso of a recumbent lion with a widely opened mouth. Later, he was depicted as two recumbent lion torsos merged with each other and still looking away from each other.

From Middle Kingdom onwards Aker appears as a pair of twin lions, one named Duaj (meaning "tomorrow") and the other Sefe (meaning "yesterday"). Aker was thus often titled "He who's looking forward and behind". When depicted as a lion pair, a hieroglyphic sign for "horizon" (two merged mountains) and a sun disc was put between the lions; the lions were sitting back-on-back.

In later times, Aker can also appear as two merged torsos of recumbent sphinxes with human heads.

== Cult ==
The location of Aker's main cult center is unknown, though. His mythological role was fully described for the first time in the famous Pyramid Texts of king Teti.

== Mythology ==
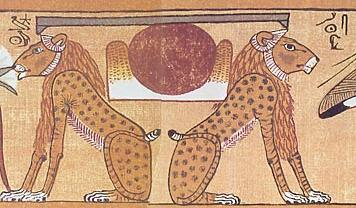
Hieroglyphic for the horizon guarded by Aker, with the sun-disk rising between the symbolic horizon (𓈌) between them. The hieroglyph for sky (𓇯) spans across the top.

Aker was first described as one of the earth gods guarding the "gate to the yonder site". He protected the deceased king against the three demonic snakes Hemtet, Iqeru and Jagw. By "encircling" (i.e. interring) the deceased king, Aker sealed the deceased away from the poisonous breath of the snake demons. Another earth deity, who joined and promoted Aker's work, was Geb. Thus, Aker was connected with Geb. In other spells and prayers, Aker is connected with Seth and even determined with the Set animal. This is interesting, because Seth is described as a wind deity, not as an earth deity.

In the famous Coffin Texts of Middle Kingdom period, Aker replaces the god Kherty, becoming now the "ferryman of Ra in his nocturnal barque". Aker protects the sun god during his nocturnal travelling through the underworld caverns. In the famous Book of the Dead, Aker also "gives birth" to the god Khepri, the young, rising sun in the shape of a scarab beetle, after Aker has carried Khepri's sarcophagus safely through the underworld caverns. In other underworld scenes, Aker carries the nocturnal barque of Ra. During his journey, in which Aker is asked to hide the body of the dead Osiris beneath his womb, Aker is protected by the god Geb.

In several inscriptions, wall paintings and reliefs, Aker was connected to the horizon of the North and the West, forming a mythological bridge between the two horizons with his body. Certain sarcophagus texts from the tombs of Ramesses IV, Djedkhonsuiusankh and Pediamenopet describe how the sun god Ra travels through the underworld "like Apophis going through the belly of Aker after Apophis was cut by Seth". In this case, Aker seems to be some kind of representation of the underworld itself.

== See also ==
- Aqen
- Ruty
