= Krystyna Dąbrowska =

Polish artist (1906–1944)

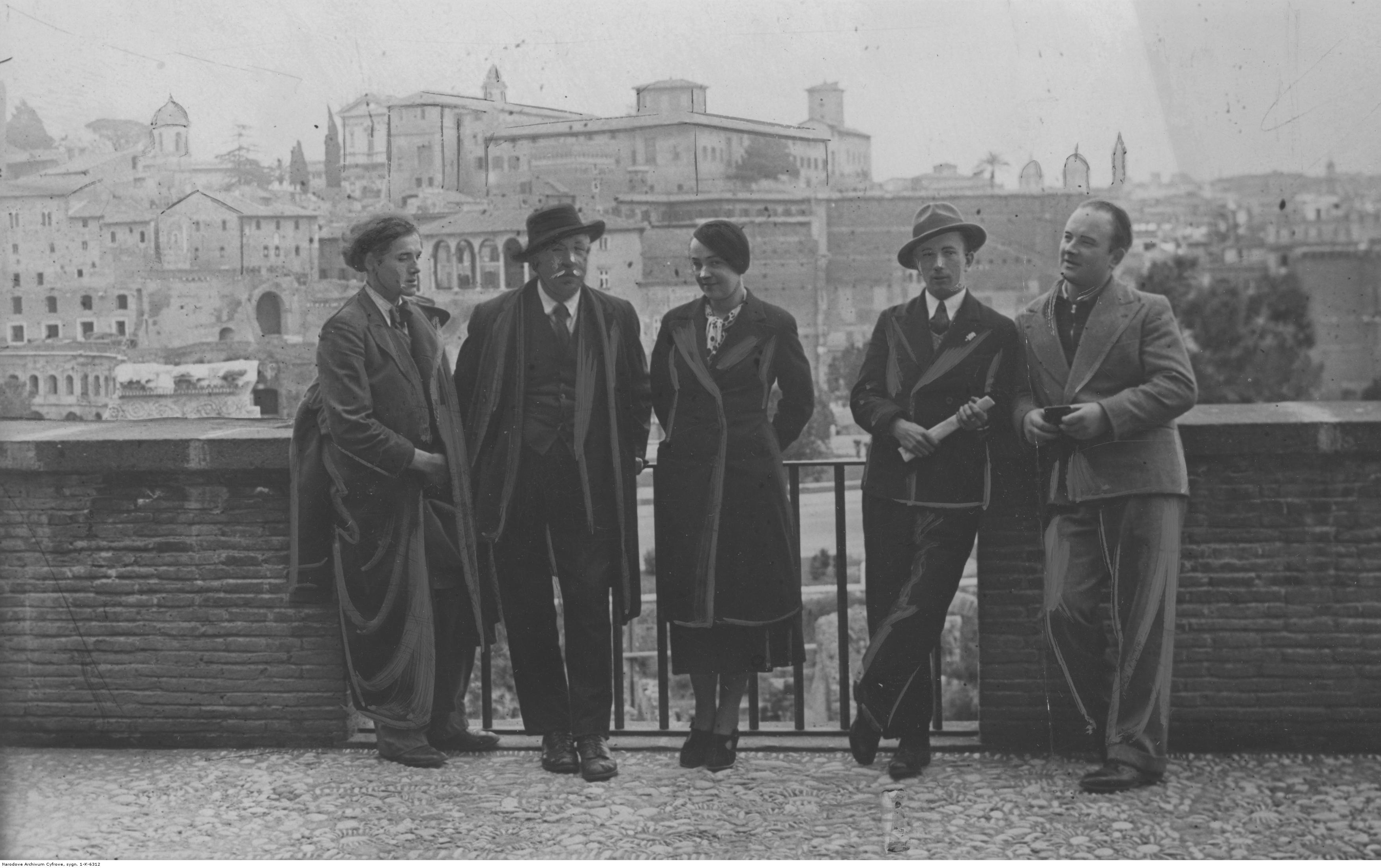
- A group of Polish artists in 1936. Dąbrowska is third from the left.
- Born: 26 November 1906; Warsaw, Poland
- Died: 1 September 1944 (aged 37); Warsaw, General Government
- Notable work: Popiersie Józefa Piłsudskiego, Marynarz, Biegacz, Rzut oszczepem
- Awards: Cross of Valour (Polish: Krzyż Walecznych)

Krystyna Dąbrowska (26 November 1906 – 1 September 1944) was a Polish sculptor and painter, and a Warsaw Uprising insurgent. Her work was part of the sculpture event in the art competition at the 1936 Summer Olympics.

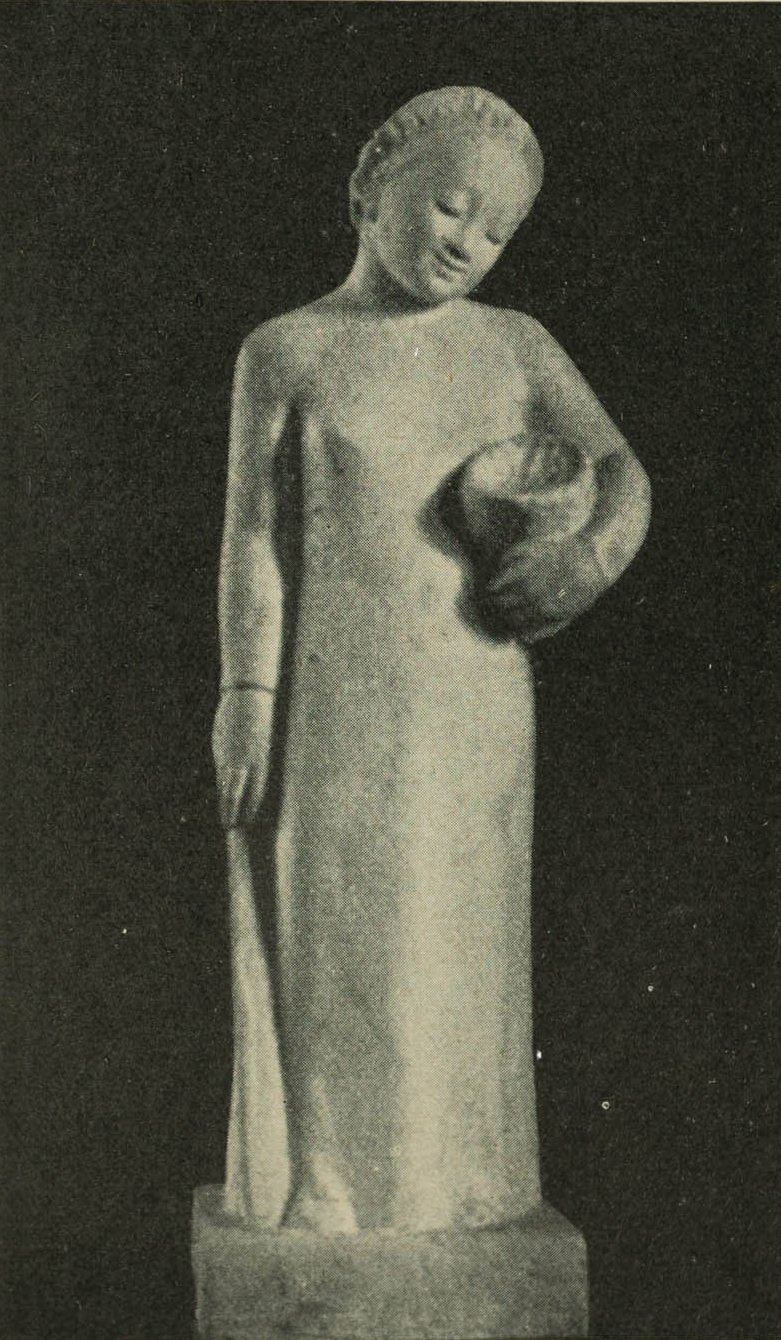
Dąbrowska's sculpture of Saint Barbara, from the Greater Poland "Plastyka" Exhibition of Religious Art, Poznań, April-May 1934

She studied at National Artistic School in Poznań (1925–1930), Academy of Fine Arts in Warsaw (1933–1935) and Royal Academy of Fine Arts in Rome. She was a member of Polish Association of Artists - "The Capitol". Most of her works were destroyed during the Second World War. She died in the Warsaw Uprising.

== Bibliography ==
- Słownik artystów polskich i obcych w Polsce działających (in Polish). Vol. II. Wrocław: Ossolineum. 1975.
