= Władysław Bakałowicz =

Polish-French painter

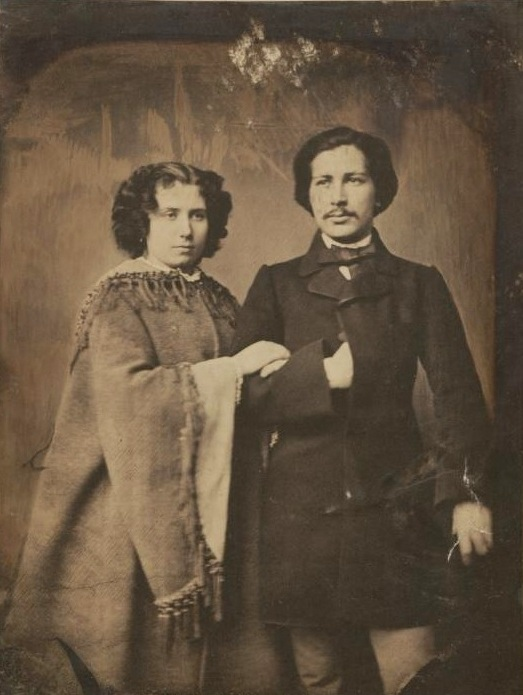
Bakałowicz and his wife Wiktoryna (date unknown)

Władysław Bakałowicz (1831–1904) was a Polish-French painter; primarily of genre scenes and portraits.

== Biography ==
Bakałowicz was born in Chrzanów in the Austrian Empire.

From 1846 to 1852, he was enrolled at the School of Fine Arts in Warsaw, and continued auditing classes there until 1854. Initially, he painted portraits, mostly of the Polish nobility, then took interest in genre and historical scenes. He also created some church icons.

In 1863, after the start of the January Uprising, Bakałowicz became part of the Great Emigration and moved to Paris, taking French citizenship. His most popular works there were miniatures, largely consisting of costume scenes from the 16th and 17th centuries; especially scenes from the court of King Henry II.

Later, he painted scenes from literary works; notably The Three Musketeers by Dumas. He exhibited at the Salon from 1865 to 1883 and had showings throughout northern Europe. Most of his works are in the Kraków and Warsaw National Museums.

His wife was the popular stage actress, Wiktoryna Bakałowiczowa. Their son, Stefan, also became a well-known painter.

Bakałowicz died in 1904 in Paris.
