= Polish Association of Artists – "The Capitol" =

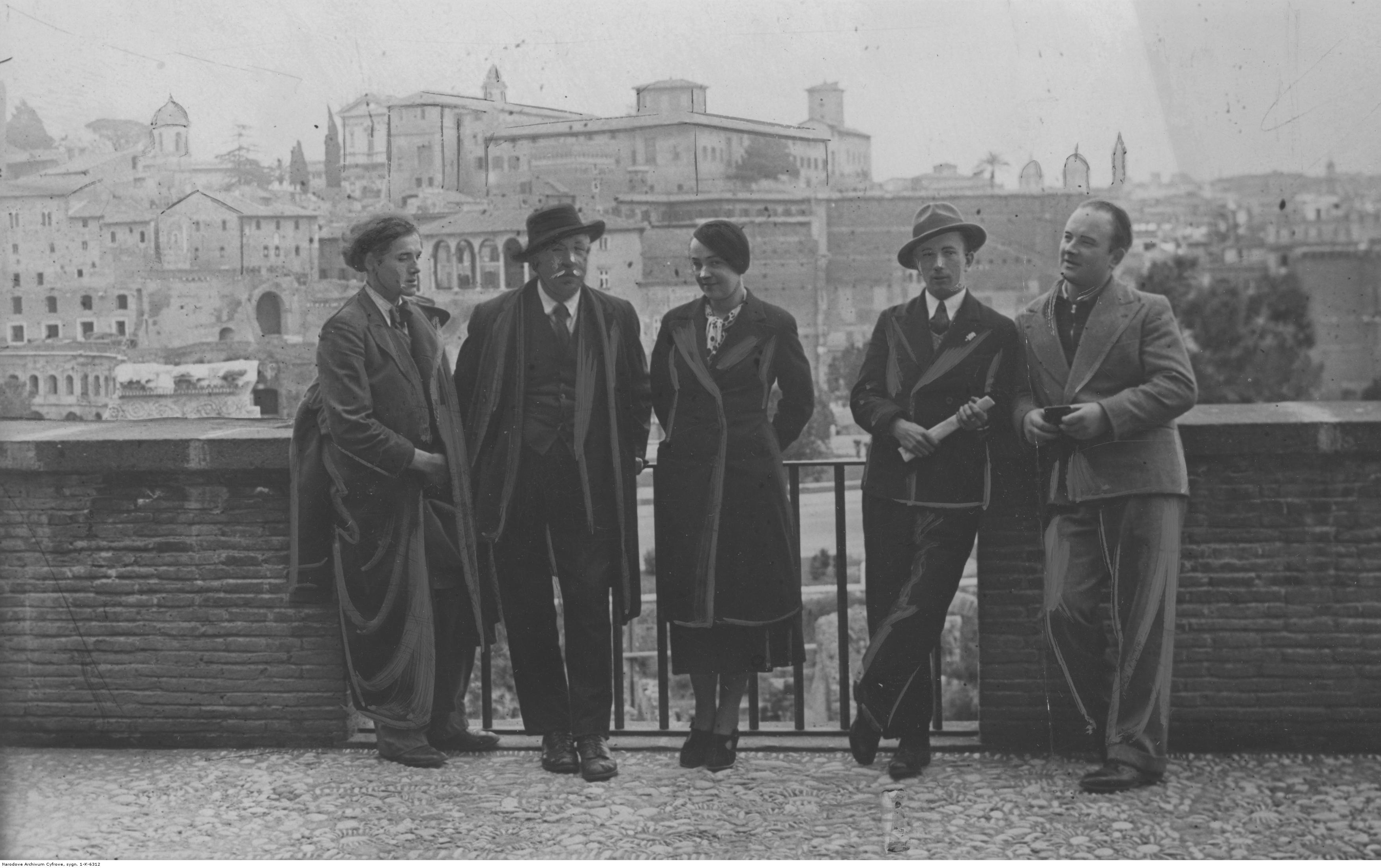
- Members of the Capitol in Rome (from the left): sculptor Józef Gosławski, painter Wiktor Mazurowski, sculptor Krystyna Dąbrowska, painter Jan Dzieślewski, painter Michał Paszyn.
- Formation: 1936
- Location: Rome, Kingdom of Italy
- President: Jan Dzieślewski

Polish Association of Artists - "The Capitol" (Polish: Polska Organizacja Artystów Plastyków "Kapitol") - organization established in Italy in 1936. The Association organized a few exhibitions where it presented works of its members.

The authorities of Association:

- president - Jan Dzieślewski;
- other members of Board and Audit Committee: Stefan Bakałowicz, Jadwiga Bohdanowicz, Krystyna Dąbrowska, Józef Gosławski, Leonard Kociewski, Antoni Madeyski, Wiktor Mazurowski, Michał Paszyn, Leon Siemiradzki.

== Bibliography ==
- Rudzka, Anna (2011). "Grupa Kapitol - mało znany epizod polsko-włoskich związków artystycznych". Iter Italicum. Sztuka i Historia (in Polish and Italian). Warszawa: Wydawnictwo Uniwersytetu Kardynała Stefana Wyszyńskiego. pp. 243–267. ISBN 978-83-7072-615-7.
