= Pylon (architecture) =

Monumental gateway of an Egyptian temple

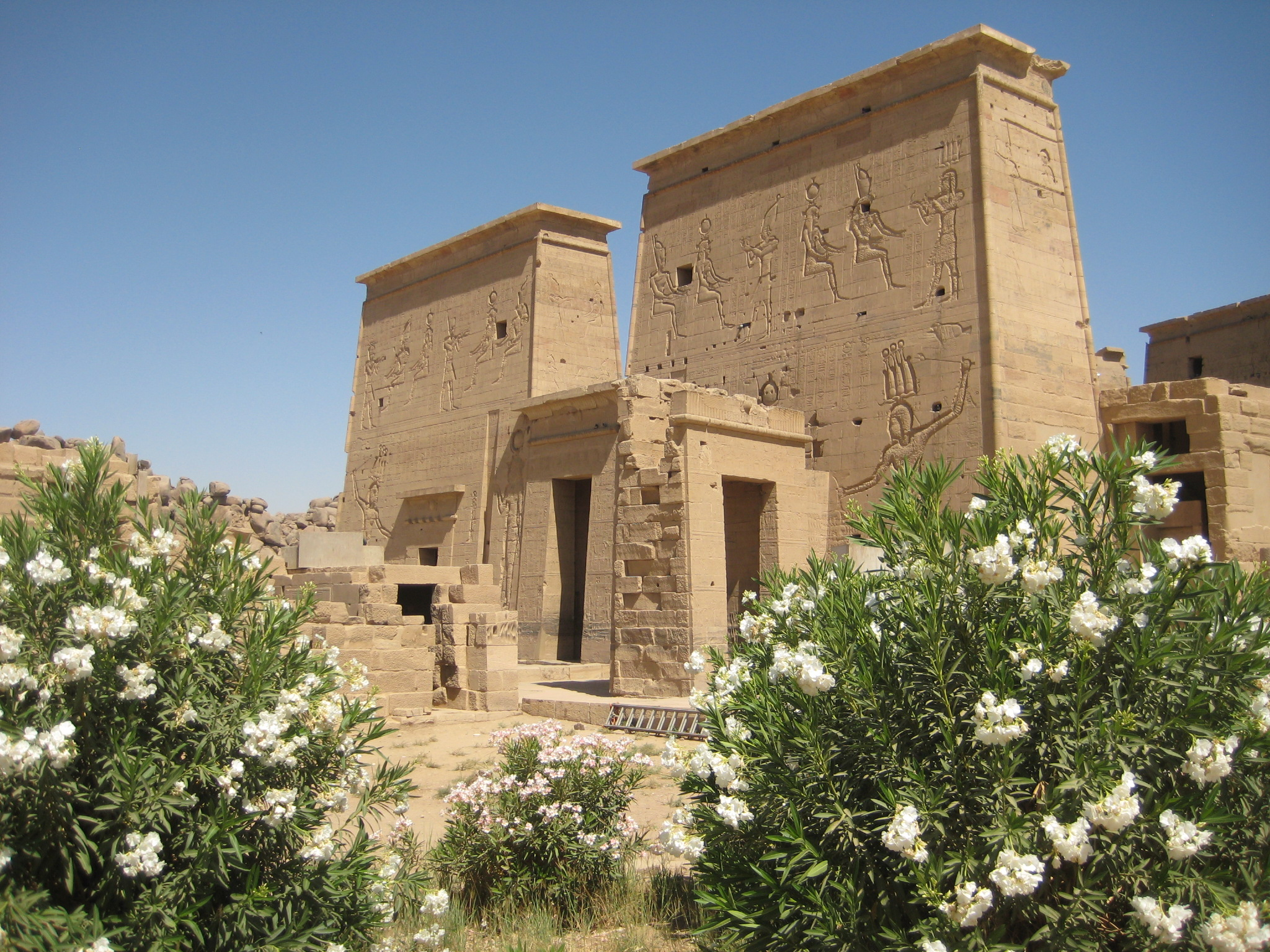
Temple of Isis first pylon, Philae

In ancient Egyptian architecture, a pylon is a monumental gate of an Egyptian temple (Egyptian: bxn.t in the Manuel de Codage transliteration). The English word "pylon" comes from the Greek term πύλη 'gate'. The Egyptian pylon consists of two pyramidal towers, each tapered and surmounted by a cornice, joined by a less elevated section enclosing the entrance between them. The gate was generally about half the height of the towers. Contemporary paintings of pylons show them with long poles flying banners.

== Egyptian architecture ==
N27
Akhet 'horizon')
in hieroglyphs

In ancient Egyptian religion, the pylon mirrored the hieroglyph akhet 'horizon', which was a depiction of two hills "between which the sun rose and set". Consequently, it played a critical role in the symbolic architecture of a building associated with the place of re-creation and rebirth.

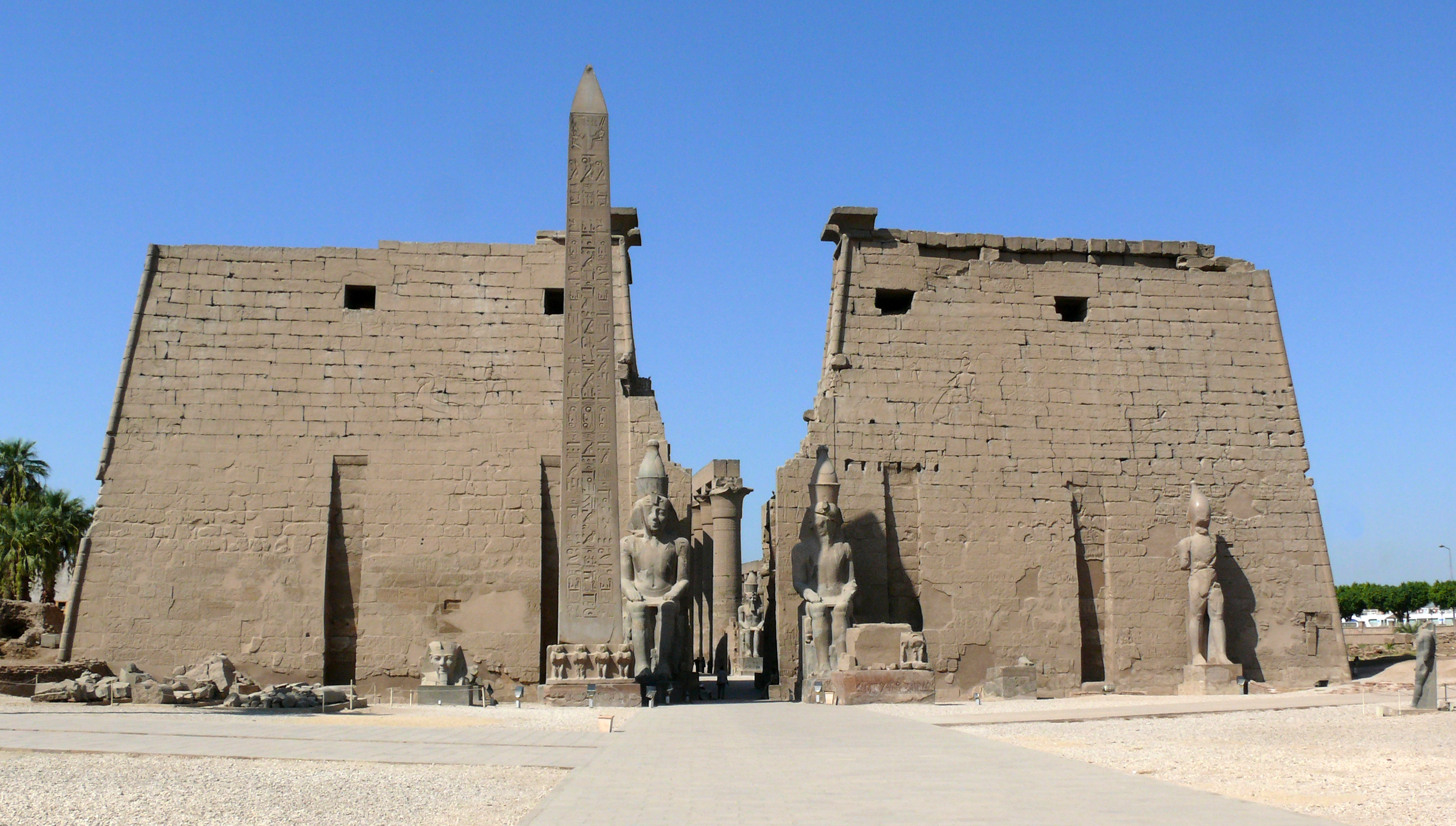
The Luxor Temple

Pylons were often decorated with scenes emphasizing a king's authority, since they were the public faces of buildings. On the first pylon of the temple of Isis at Philae, the pharaoh is shown slaying his enemies while Isis, Horus and Hathor look on. Other examples of pylons can be seen in Karnak, Luxor Temple and Edfu. Rituals to the god Amun were often carried out on the top of temple pylons. A pair of obelisks usually stood in front of a pylon.

In addition to standard vertical grooves on the exterior face of a pylon wall which were designed to hold flag poles, some pylons also contained internal stairways and rooms. The oldest intact pylons belong to mortuary temples from the Ramesside period in the 13th and 12th centuries BCE.

The gateways between pylon towers were originally fitted with large wooden doors, often decorated with metals such as bronze, silver, gold, or electrum. These doors helped limit physical and visual access to the sacred areas of Egyptian temples.

== Revival architecture ==
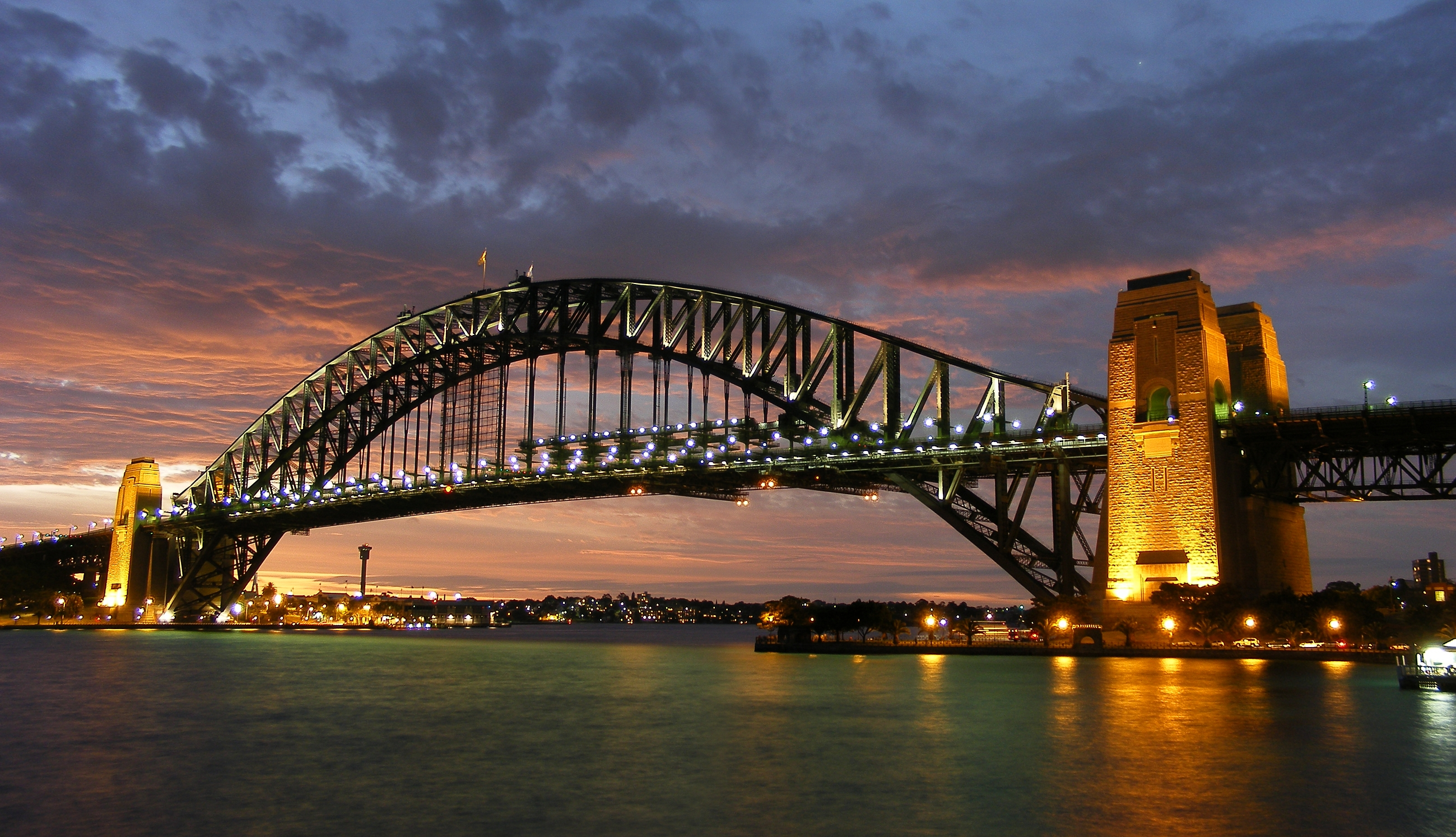
The Sydney Harbour Bridge

Both Neoclassical and Egyptian Revival architecture employ the pylon form, with Boodle's gentlemen's club in London being an example of the Neoclassical style.

The 19th and 20th centuries saw pylon architecture employed for bridges such as the Sydney Harbour Bridge and as stand-alone monuments such as the Patcham Pylon in Brighton and Hove, England.

== Gallery ==
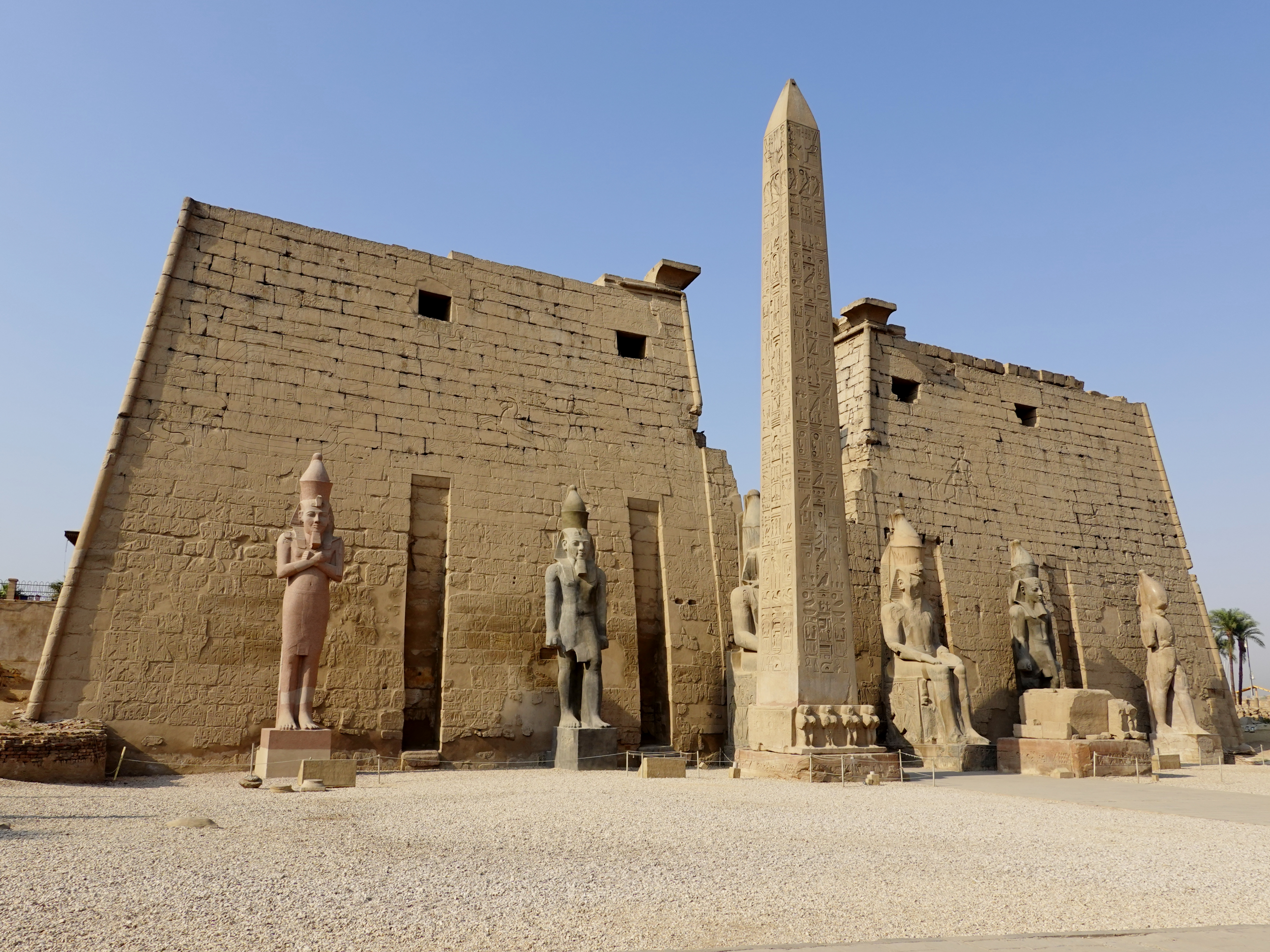
Entrance of the Luxor Temple, western façade; a pair of obelisks usually stood in front of a pylon; the 2nd obelisk (the Luxor Obelisk, 23 metres (75 ft) high, not shown) was moved in the 1830s to the Place de la Concorde in France.

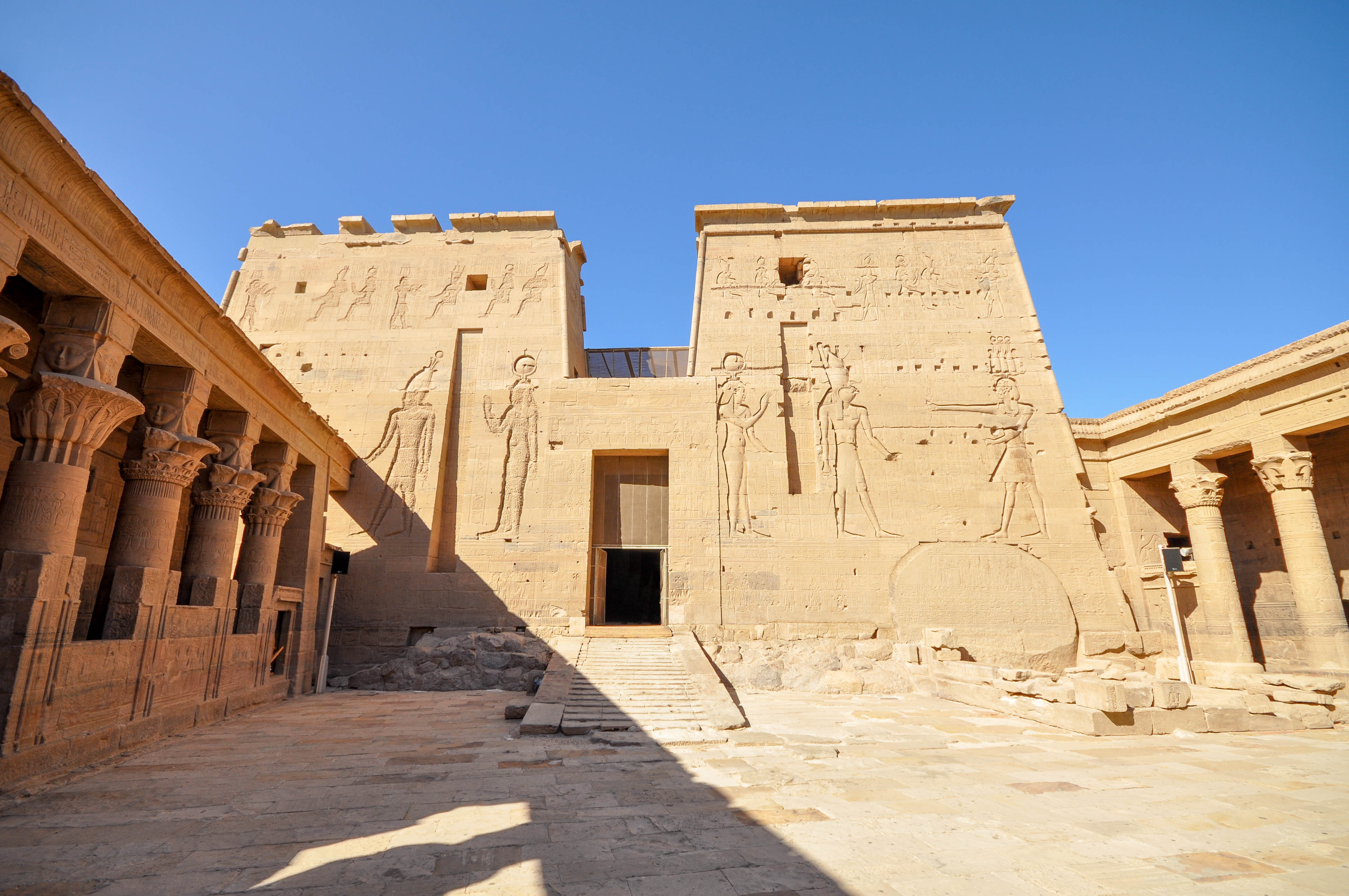
Temple of Isis second pylon, Philae, western façade

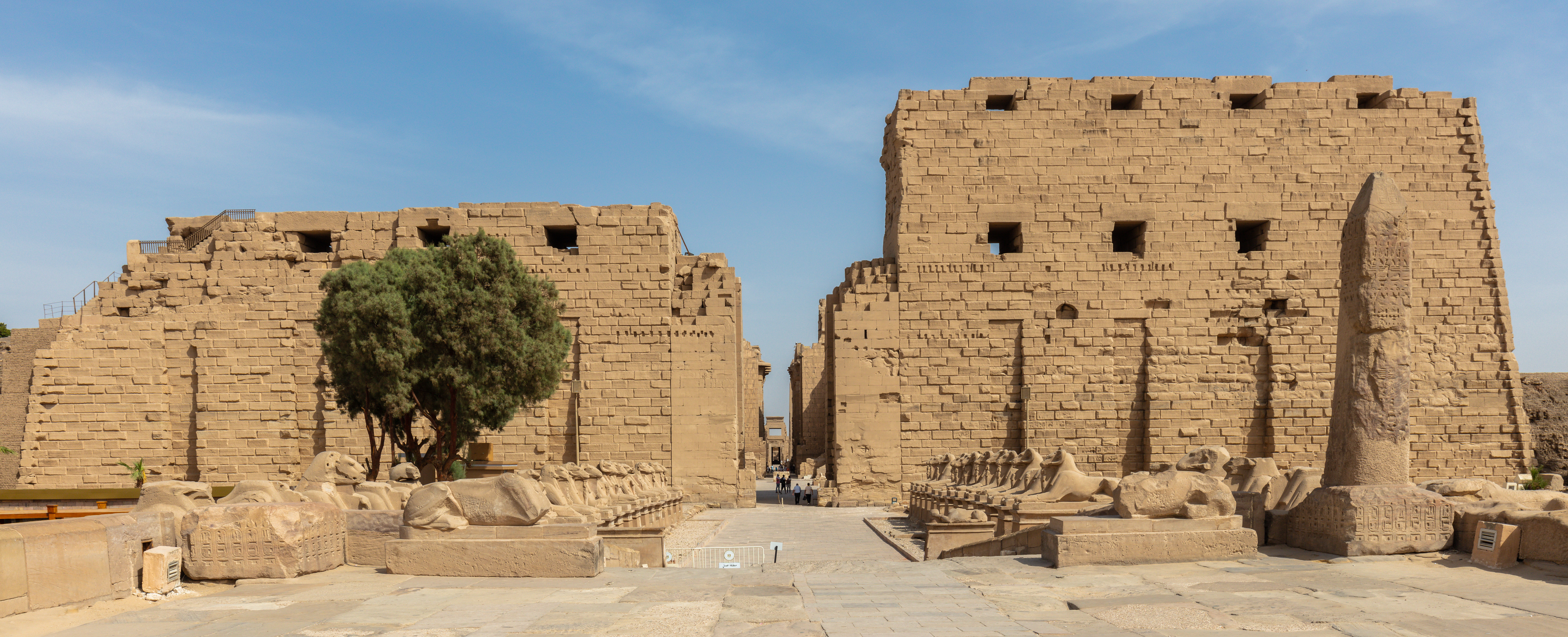
One of the pylon entrances of the Karnak Temple Complex, with a surviving obelisk

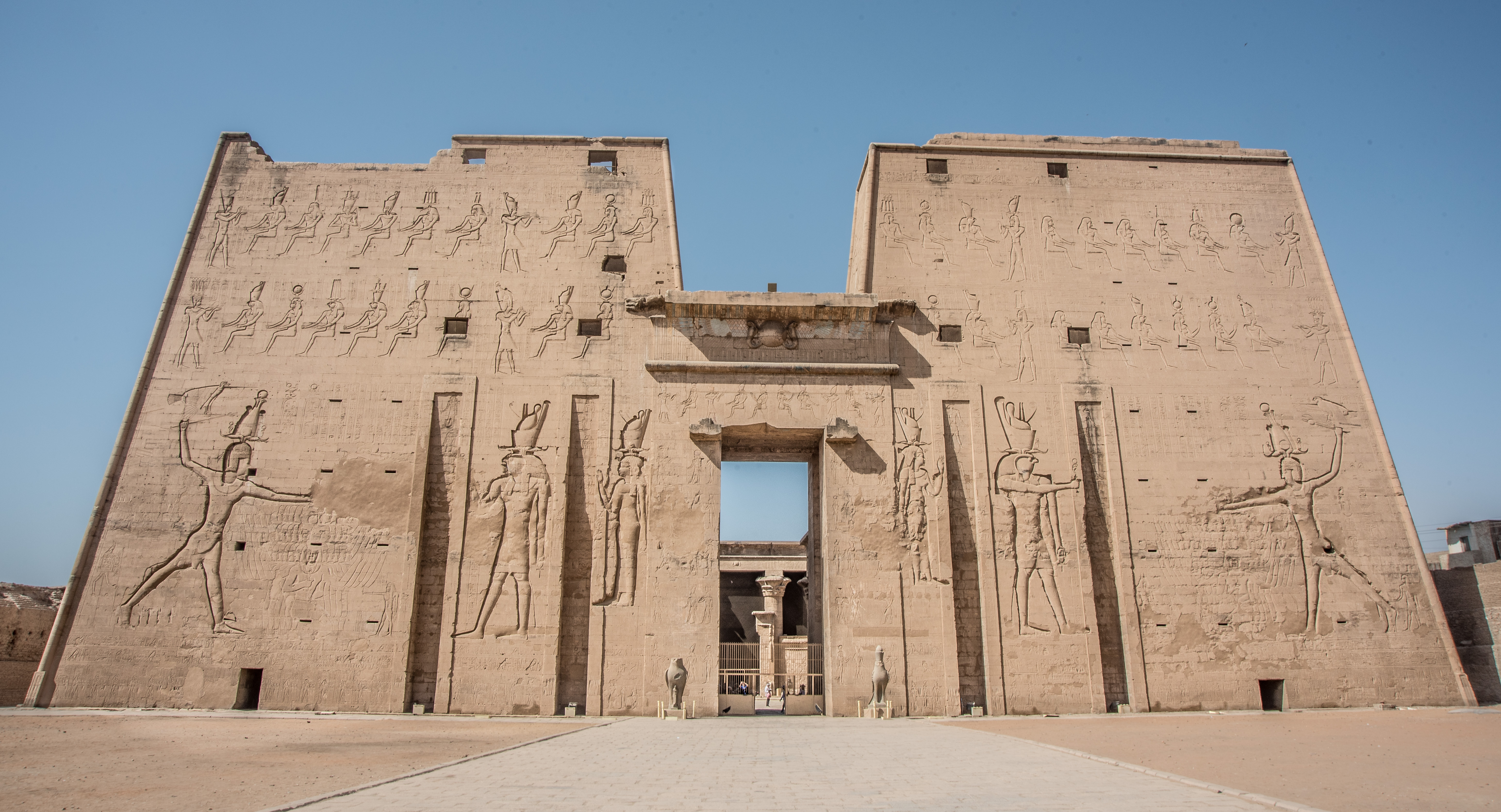
Pylon of Temple of Edfu

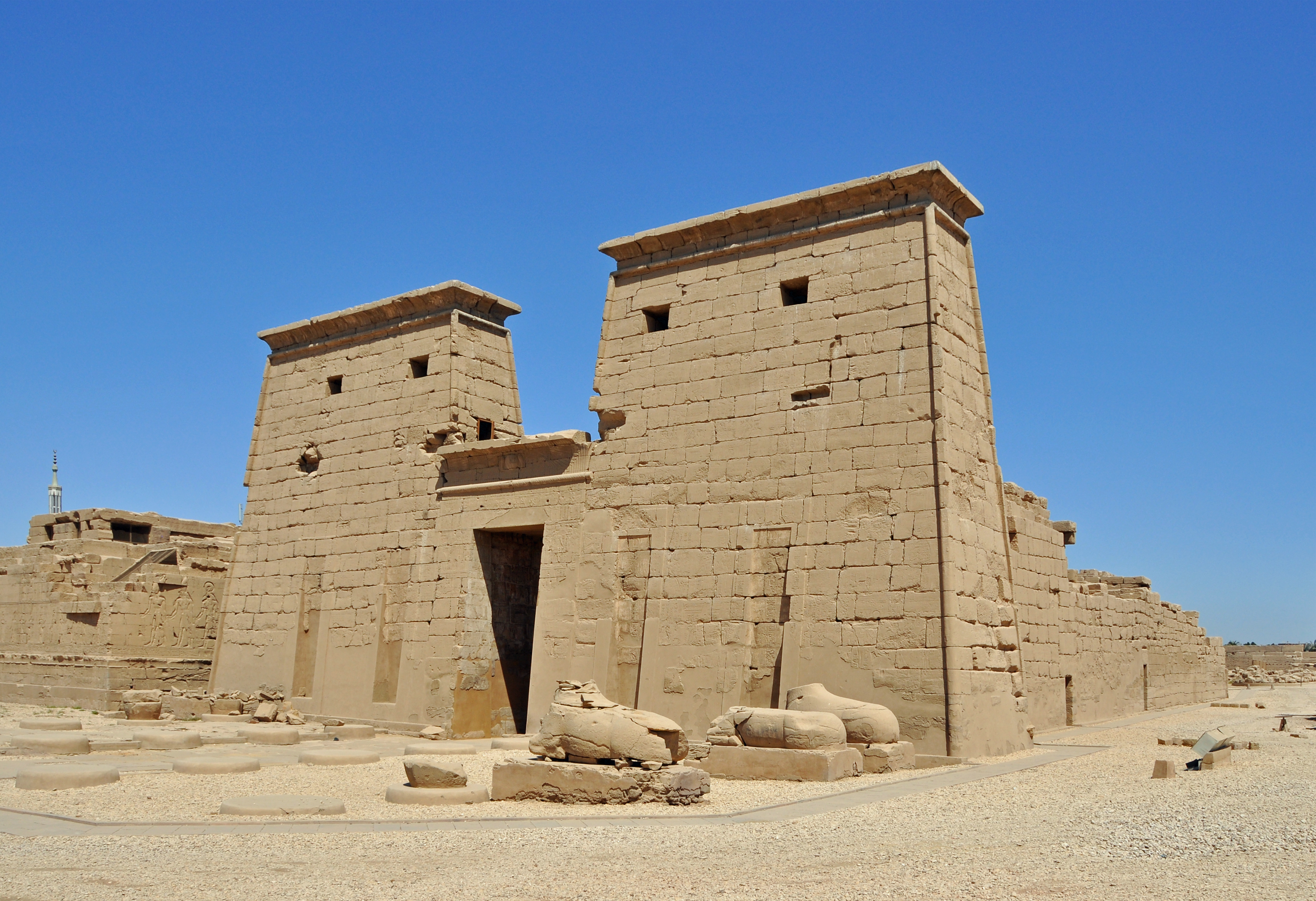
Temple of Khonsu in Karnak

== See also ==
- Ancient Egyptian architecture
- Column
