= Akhet (hieroglyph) =

Egyptian hieroglyph that represents the sun rising over a mountain

N27
Akhet (horizon)
in hieroglyphs

Akhet (Ancient Egyptian: Ꜣḫt; Gardiner: N27) is an Egyptian hieroglyph that represents the sun rising over a mountain. It is translated as "horizon" or "the place in the sky where the sun rises". Betrò describes it as "Mountain with the Rising Sun" (The hieroglyph for "mountain" is 𓈋) and an ideogram for "horizon".

Akhet appears in the Egyptian name for the Great Pyramid of Giza (Akhet Khufu), but in this case, it is written with the sign of the crested ibis, as shown by Verner, 2001, at page 189. The symbol of the sun rising between hills is present in the name of Akhetaten, the city founded by pharaoh Akhenaten. In the name of Akhenaten, there is the sign of the crested ibis It also appears in the name of the syncretized form of Ra and Horus, Ra-Horakhty (Rꜥ Ḥr Ꜣḫty, "Ra–Horus of the Horizons").

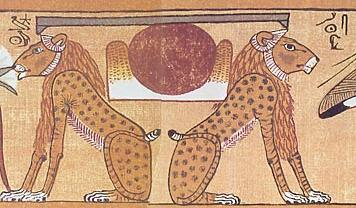
Hieroglyphic for the horizon guarded by Aker.

In ancient Egyptian architecture, the pylon mirrored the hieroglyph. The symbol is sometimes connected with the astrological sign of Libra and the Egyptian deity Aker, who guards the eastern and western horizons.
