= Stefan Bakałowicz =

Polish artist (1857–1947)

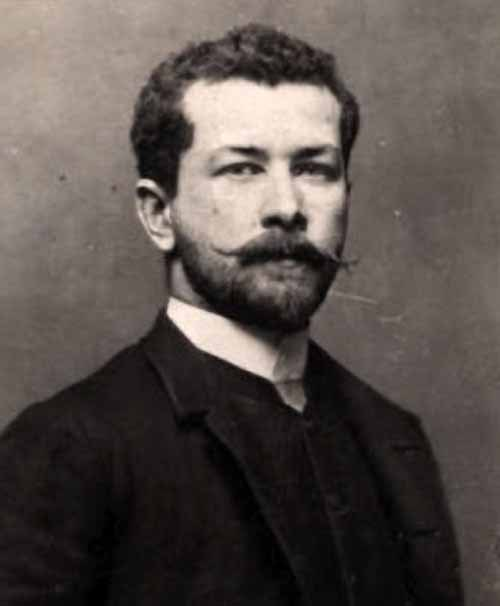
- 1890s
- Born: 17 October 1857; Warsaw, Congress Poland, Russian Empire
- Died: 2 May 1947 (aged 89); Rome, Italy
- Education: Member Academy of Arts (1886)
- Alma mater: Imperial Academy of Arts (1879)
- Known for: Painting
- Awards: Big Gold Medal of the Imperial Academy of Arts (1881)

Stefan Bakałowicz (17 October 1857 – 2 May 1947) was a Polish painter from Warsaw, famous in the Russian Empire. He was noted for his paintings on the subjects of Ancient Rome. From 1936 he was a member of authorities of Polish Association of Artists – "The Capitol". His father was the painter Władysław Bakałowicz.

== Gallery ==
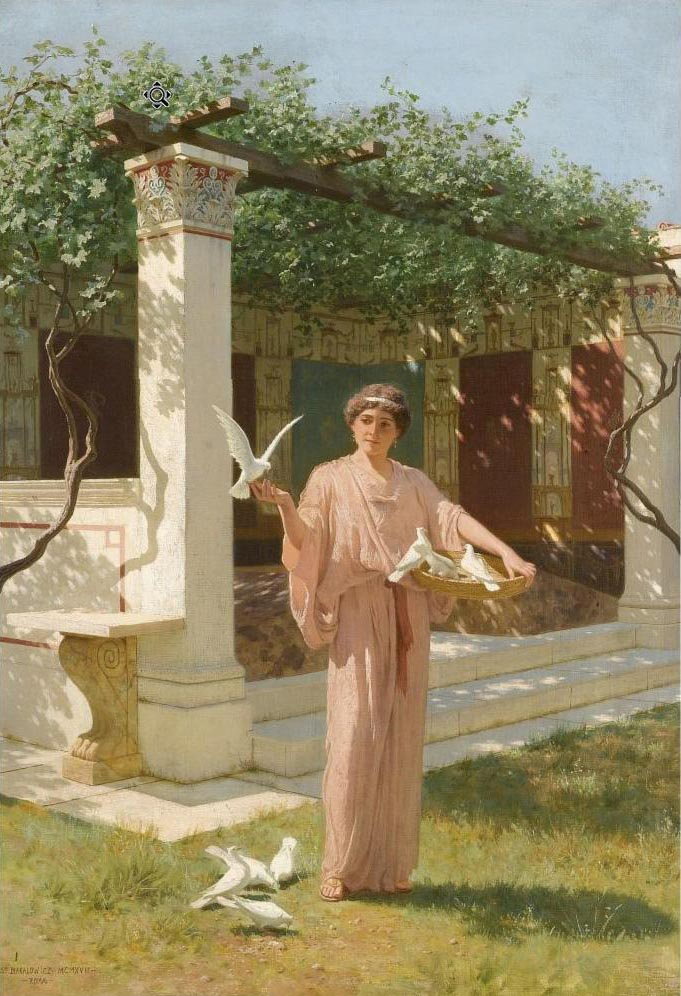
Feeding the Doves

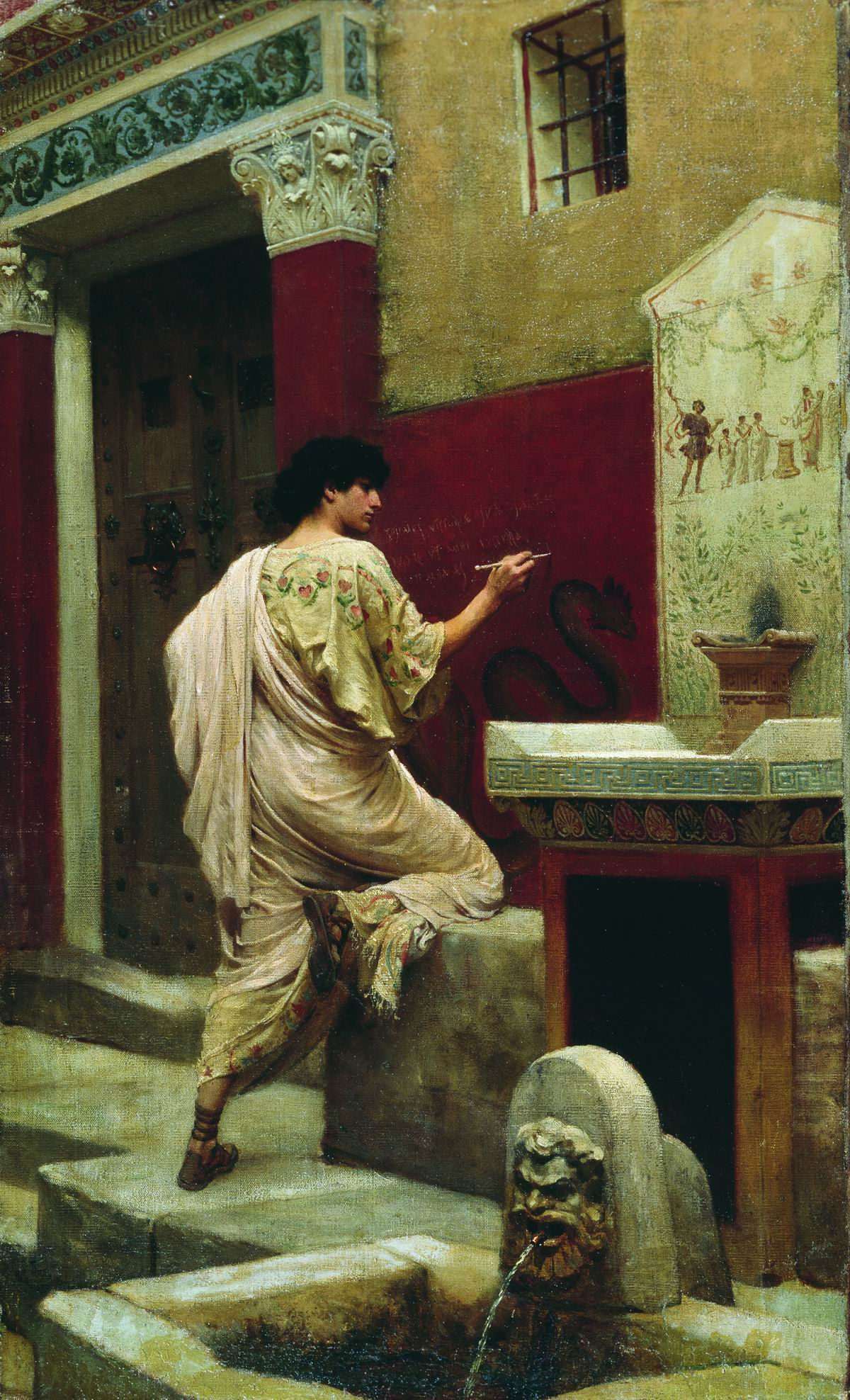
At the Walls of Pompeii

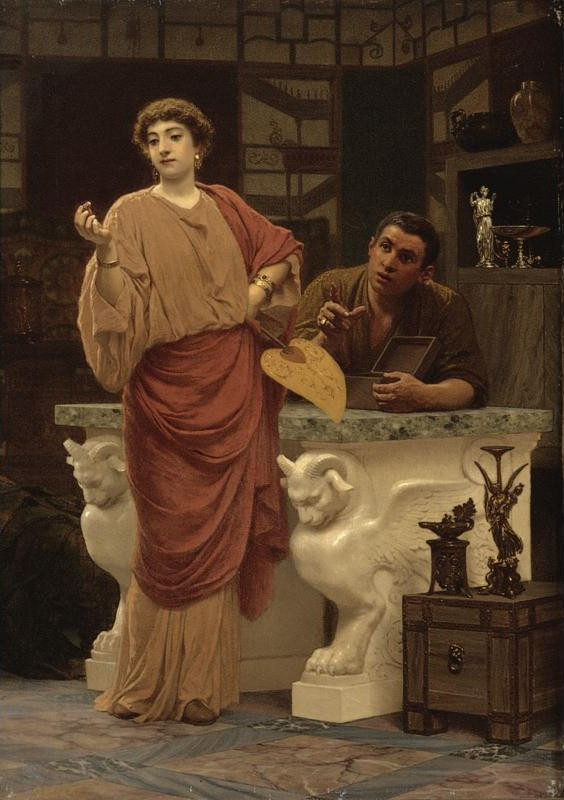
A Little Luxury

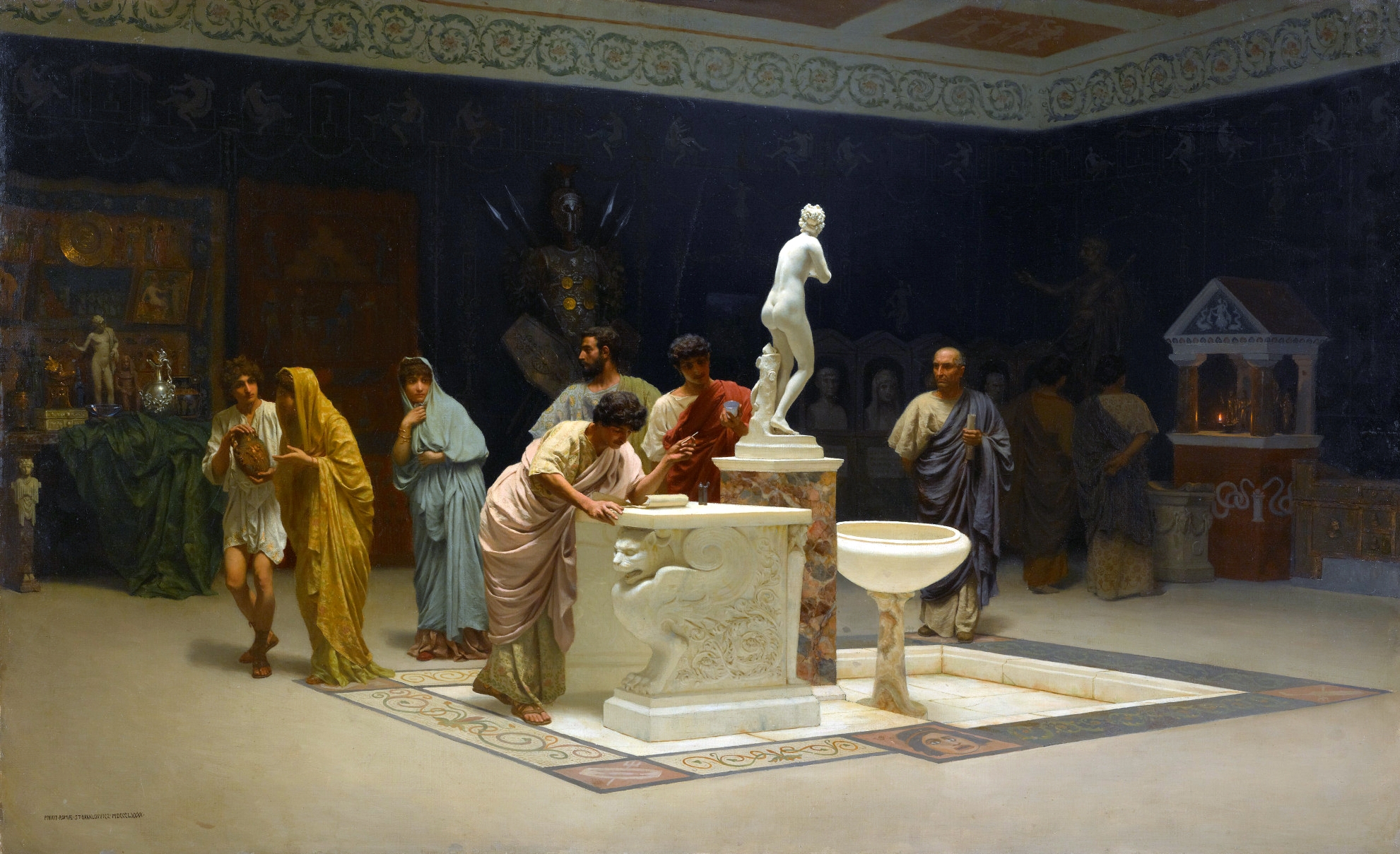
Maecenas' Reception Room

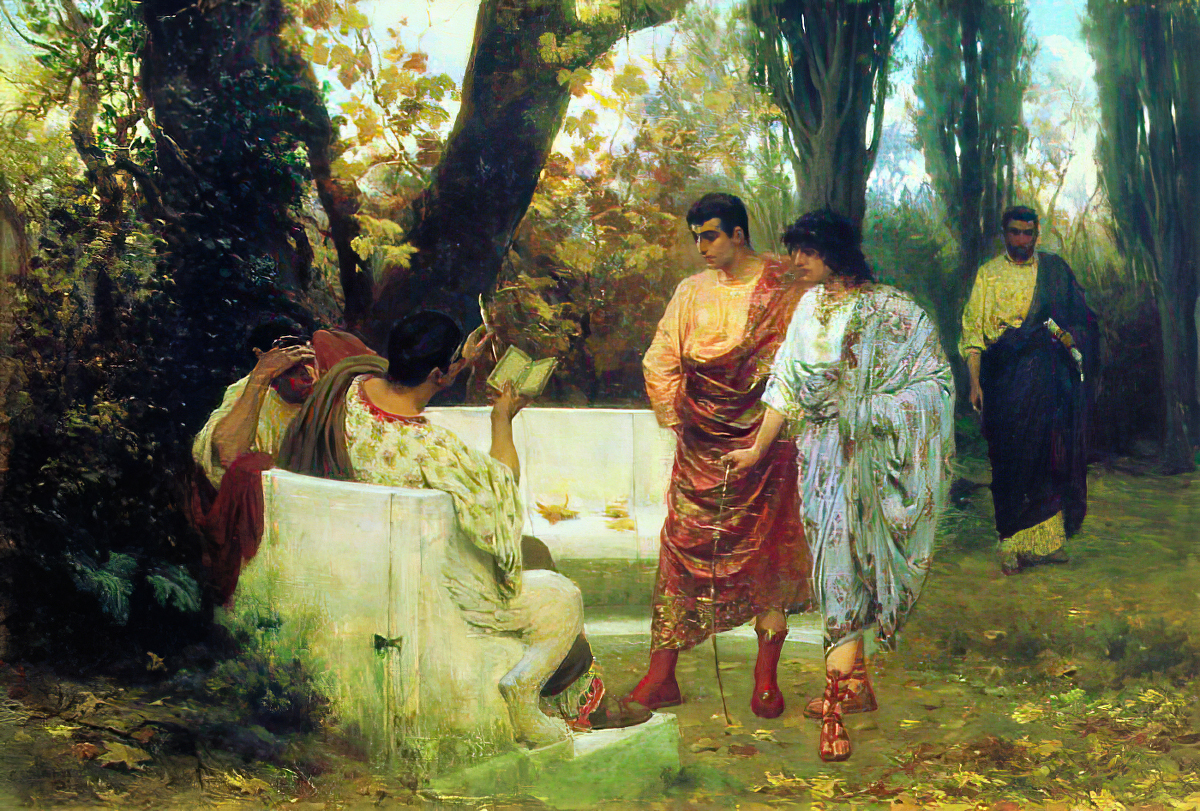
Catullus
