= Land of Manu =

Where the sun god Ra sets every evening according to Ancient Egyptian religion

In ancient Egyptian religion, the land of Manu (the West) is where the sun god Ra sets every evening. It is mentioned in the Book of the Dead.
