= Joseph Smith Papyri =

Egyptian papyri owned by Joseph Smith, Jr.

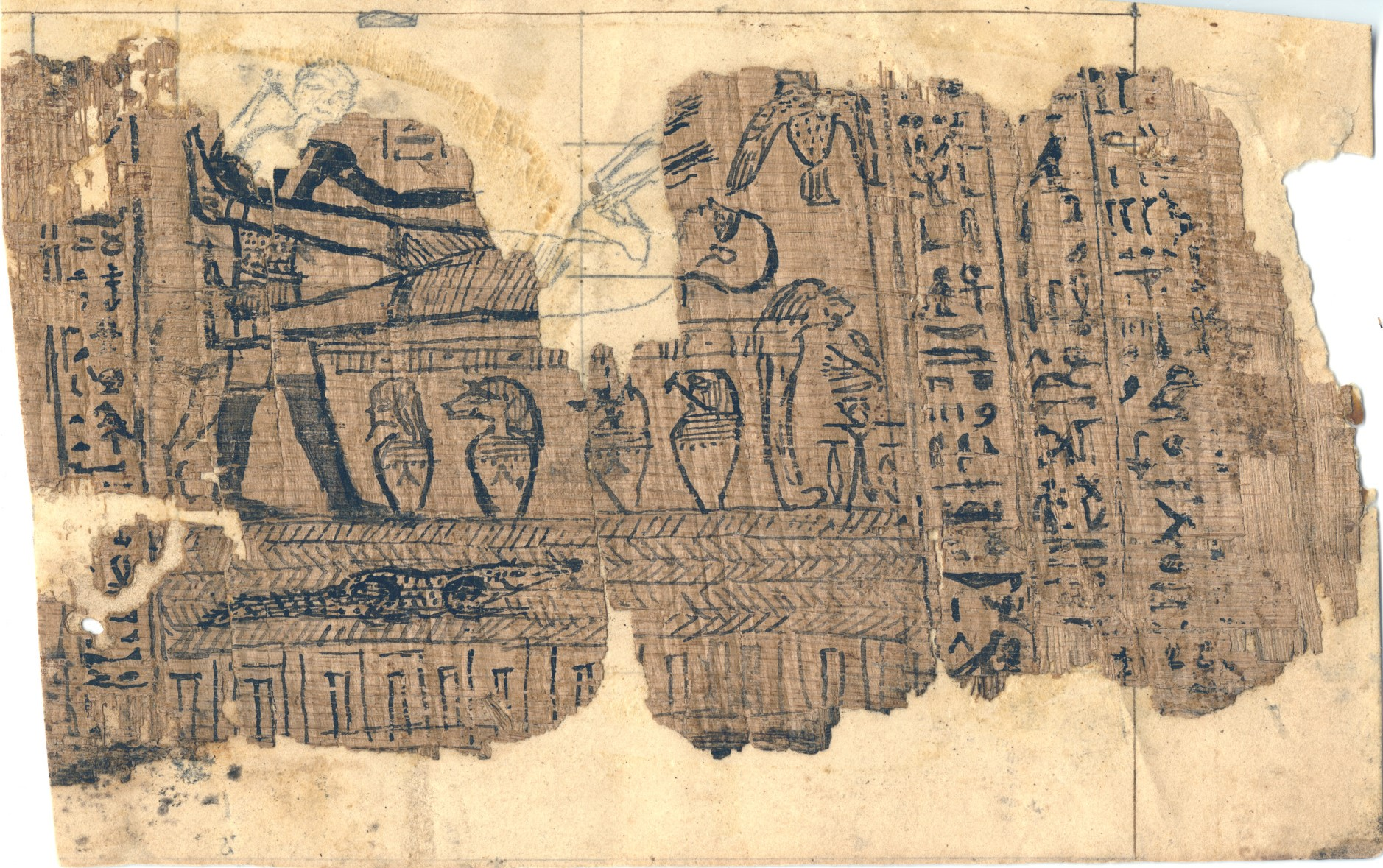
A portion of the Joseph Smith Papyri

The Joseph Smith Papyri (JSP) are Egyptian funerary papyrus fragments from ancient Thebes dated between 300 and 100 BC which, along with four mummies, were once owned by Joseph Smith, the founder of the Latter Day Saint movement. Smith purchased the mummies and papyrus documents from a traveling exhibitor in Kirtland, Ohio, in 1835. Smith said that the papyrus contained the records of the ancient patriarchs Abraham and Joseph.

In 1842, Smith published the first part of the Book of Abraham, which he said was an inspired translation from the papyri. The consensus among both Mormon and non-Mormon scholars is that the characters on the surviving papyrus fragments do not match Smith's translation. A translation of the Book of Joseph was never published by Smith, but the scroll purported to be the untranslated Book of Joseph has been found to be a copy of the Egyptian Book of the Dead, a common funerary document, which contains no references to the biblical patriarch Joseph.

After Smith's death, the papyri passed through several hands; they were presumed to have reached a museum in Chicago and subsequently destroyed in the Great Chicago Fire. Not all of the fragments were burned, however, and some were eventually acquired by the Metropolitan Museum of Art in 1947. The museum knew the importance of the papyri to the Church of Jesus Christ of Latter-day Saints (LDS Church) and, in 1966, reached out to church leaders to notify them of their collection. The LDS Church acquired the fragments in 1967. The rediscovery of the papyri sparked renewed interest and scholarship. Due to the importance of the papyri to the Latter Day Saint movement, they have been heavily studied and debated.

== Contents ==
There were four mummies, two rolls, and various other fragments of papyri purchased by Joseph Smith and his associates. Eyewitness accounts conflict on the gender of the mummies, indicating it was difficult to tell. Oliver Cowdery wrote:

...in connection with two of the bodies, were something rolled up with the same kind of linnen [sic], saturated with the same bitumen, which, when examined, proved to be two rolls of papyrus, previously mentioned. I may add that two or three other small pieces of papyrus, with astronomical calculations, epitaphs, etc were found with others of the Mummies.

According to Cowdery, these two scrolls contained "the writings of Abraham and Joseph."

W. W. Phelps, Joseph Smith's scribe in 1835, wrote in a letter to his wife:

The last of June four Egyptian mummies were brought here; there were two papyrus rolls, besides some other ancient Egyptian writings with them. As no one could translate these writings, they were presented to President Smith. He soon knew what they were and said they, the 'rolls of papyrus,' contained the sacred record kept of Joseph in Pharaoh's Court in Egypt, and the teachings of Father Abraham.

Because the collection was later sold and divided and parts of it were lost in the Great Chicago Fire, its exact contents are unknown. However, based on what is still in existence, it can be concluded that there were at least 5 separate funerary documents as shown in the following table:

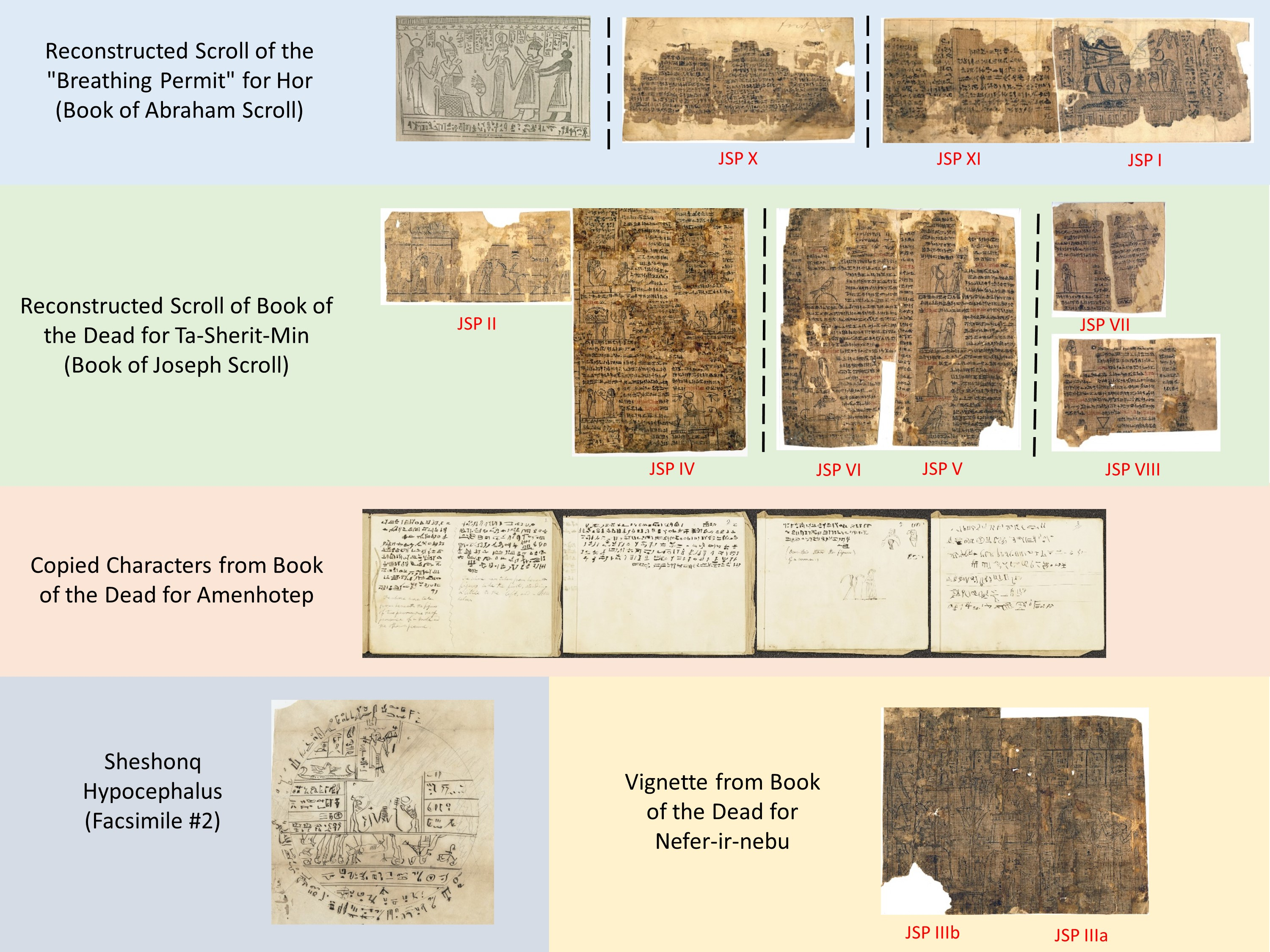
Reconstructed papyri from existing and known fragments

Known Egyptian documents sold to Joseph Smith
Egyptian document	Text description	Joseph Smith description	Joseph Smith Papyri Number	Date created
"Hor Book of Breathing"	Funerary scroll made for a Theban Priest name Horus (also Horos, Hor). It is among the earliest known copies of the Book of Breathing. Sometimes referred to as a Breathing Permit or Sensen Text	"Book of Abraham"	I, torn fragments pasted into IV, X, XI and Facsimile #3	between 238–153 BC
"Ta-sherit-Min Book of the Dead"	Funerary scroll made for Ta-sherit-Min (also Tshemmin, Semminis)	"Book of Joseph"	II, IV, V, VI, VII, VIII	circa 300–100 BC
"Nefer-ir-nebu Book of the Dead" Judgement Scene	Funerary papyrus scroll fragment made for Nefer-ir-nebu (also Neferirtnub, Noufianoub) showing a vignette with the deceased standing before Osiris, waiting to have her heart weighed on a balance against a feather to determine if she is worthy of further existence or having her soul devoured by Ammit	No known description given by Joseph Smith.	III a,b	circa 300–100 BC
"Amenhotep Book of the Dead"	Fragment from a funerary scroll made for Amenhotep (also Amen-ophis)	Parts were translated as a short history of a Princess Katumin, daughter of Pharaoh Onitas	The papyrus is no longer extant. Characters were copied into a notebook (see Kirtland Egyptian Papers).	Unknown
Sheshonq Hypocephalus	A funerary text placed under the head of the deceased named Sheshonq (also Shashaq, Sesonchis)	Facsimile #2 from the "Book of Abraham"	The papyrus is no longer extant.	Unknown

== History ==
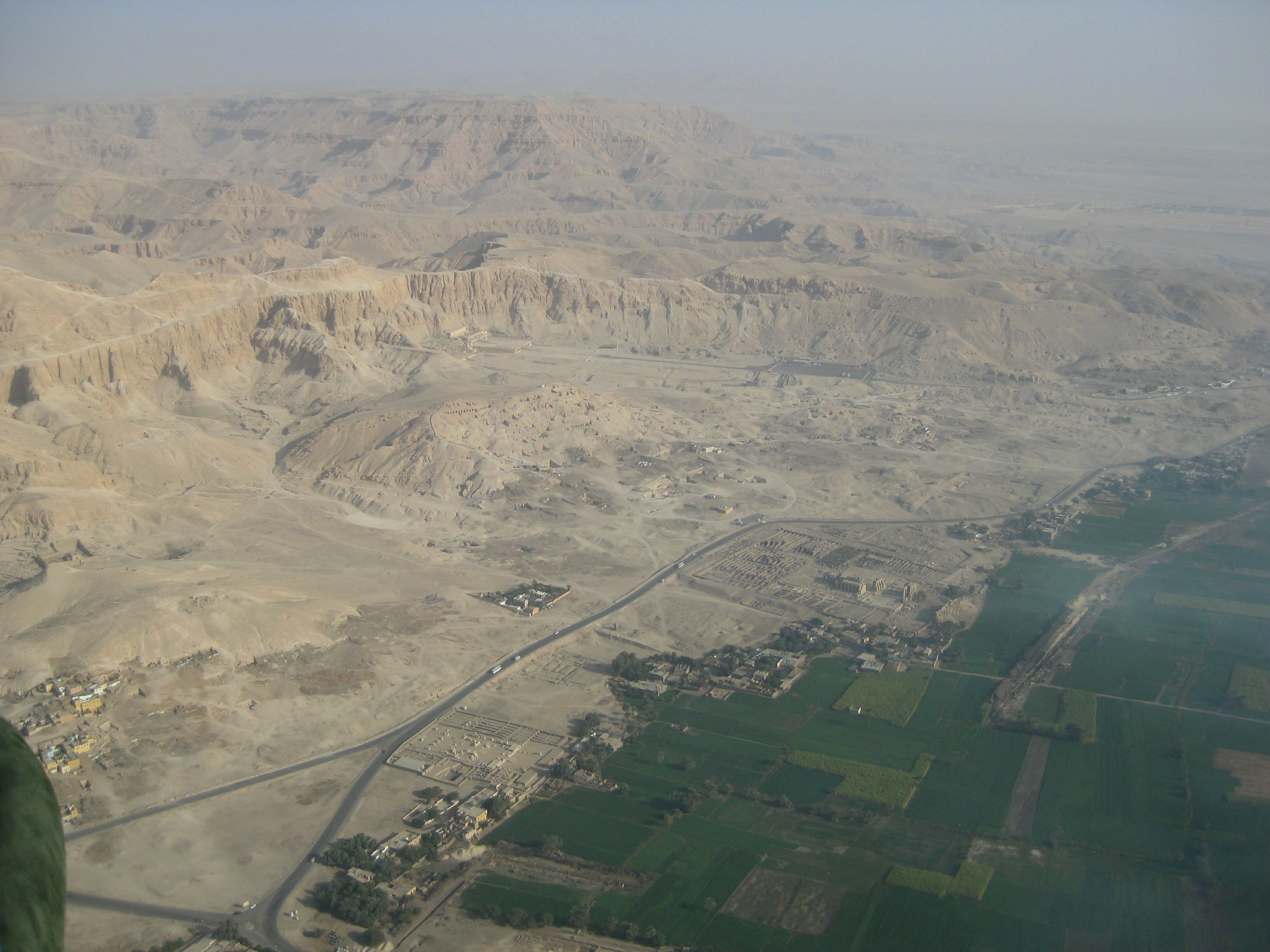
Aerial view of Theban Necropolis, east of Luxor, where it is believed Antonio Lebolo excavated the Joseph Smith Papyri

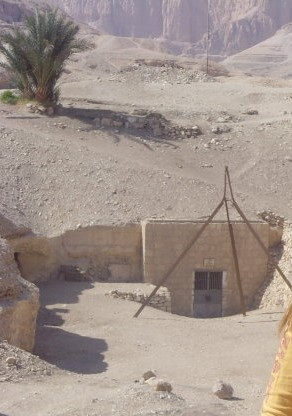
One of the Theban Tombs where Lebolo was believed to have excavated

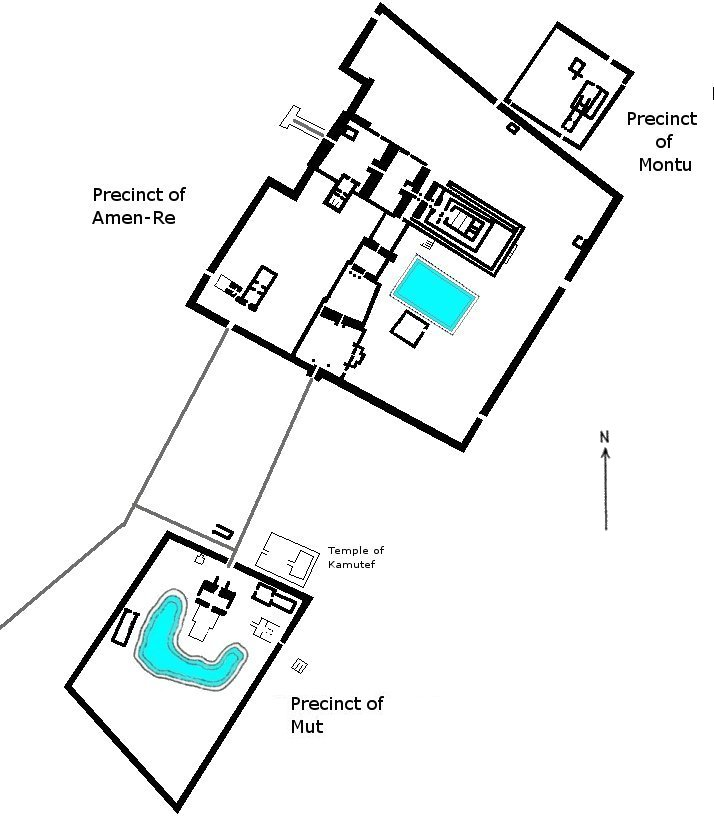
Temple complex in Thebes where Horos would have officiated (see main article Karnak)

=== Ancient origins ===
All of the mummies and papyri date to the Ptolemaic Egypt period, from sometime between 300 and 100 BC in the ancient Egyptian city of Thebes, near modern-day Luxor.

The bodies and papyri were interred west of ancient Thebes in the Theban Necropolis, probably in the valley of the nobles.

A scroll from one of the mummies has been identified as belonging to an Egyptian priest named Horos, who came from an important family of Theban Priests of Amon-Re in the cult of "Min who massacres his enemies". His family tree can be reliably reconstructed from independent sources to eight generations.

=== Discovery by Antonio Lebolo ===
Location of Theban Necropolis, where the papyri were found in Egypt

Antonio Lebolo, from the Piedmont region of modern Italy, had been a loyal follower of Napoleon, serving in his military and law enforcement. In the years following Napoleon's fall from power in 1815, Lebolo left his family and went to Egypt in order to escape the problems of Europe. He had a prominent friend, Bernardino Drovetti, who was also in Egypt for the same reason that gave him a job as his agent in Thebes. Lebolo stayed in Egypt from 1817–1822. Part of Lebolo's employment responsibilities were to undertake excavations of Egyptian antiquities to later sell. He led teams of sometimes hundreds of locals, digging throughout the Theban Necropolis, in the valley of the Kings, Queens and Nobles. Items that he excavated found their way into many modern collections, including major contributions to the Turin Museum and the Louvre.

Sometime while he was there he excavated 11 mummies and accompanying papyri, from which came the Joseph Smith Papyri collection. It appears that Drovetti allowed Lebolo to personally excavate in the Valley of the Nobles, as this collection was personally maintained by Lebolo and not passed on to Drovetti. It is not known exactly which tomb they came from, however Theban tombs 32, 33, and 157 have been named as possible candidates. Theban tomb 33 is frequently visited by LDS tour groups, and often given as the place where they were excavated based on a description by Oliver Cowdery. (Note: History of the Church 2:348-49 has Oliver Cowdery relaying the following story that Michael Chandler told him that is riddled with errors: "The records were obtained from one of the catacombs in Egypt, near a place where once stood the renowned city of Thebes, by the celebrated French traveler, Antonio Lebolo, in the year 1831. He procured license from Mehemet Ali, then viceroy of Egypt, under the protection of Chevalier Drovetti, the French Consul, in the year 1828, and employed four hundred and thirty-three men, four months and two days (if I understand correctly) - Egyptian or Turkish soldiers, at from four to six cents per diem, each man. He entered the catacomb June 7, 1831, and obtained eleven mummies. There were several hundred mummies in the same catacomb; about one hundred embalmed after the first order, and placed in niches, and two or three hundred after the second and third orders, and laid upon the floor or bottom of the grand cavity. The two last orders of embalmed were so decayed, that they could not be removed, and only eleven of the first, found in the niches." Lebolo was dead by 1831, and had left Egypt in 1822, so could not have done any of these things mentioned in the quote at those times.) However, this connection is highly speculative and disputed.

Theban Tomb 32 is presented as a possibility based on Lebolo actually carving his name in the tunnel-passage, and the existence of other finds of his that probably came from this tomb.

Before his death on the night of February 18–19, 1830, Lebolo sent the 11 mummies and papyri to Albano Oblasser of Trieste to sell them. The mummies were shipped to New York sometime between 1830 and 1833, where they ended up in the hands of Michael Chandler no later than March 1833. Chandler claimed multiple times to be the nephew of Lebolo; however, this is almost certainly untrue. (Note: Chandler was born in Ireland in 1797, and genealogists have been unable to find any connection to the Italian born Lebolo.) All evidence suggests that Chandler was acting as an agent for an investment group in Philadelphia that had purchased the mummies. (Note: Joseph Coe, one of the purchasers of the mummies wrote, "Chandler was only an agent acting under some men in Philadeplphia ... they him and was allowed the sum which he sold them to me for viz. $2400. It also appeared on the trial that the out goes while Chandler was exhibiting them exceeded the income $1550.") (Note: William Craig and Winthrop Sargent were business partners of an importing business in Philadelphia that sued Michael Chandler for $6,000 worth of "goods, wares and merchandise" in a series of lawsuits from 1838 - 1853. It is speculated that this is the lawsuit referenced by Joseph Coe (see previous footnote).)

=== On tour in the North Eastern States ===
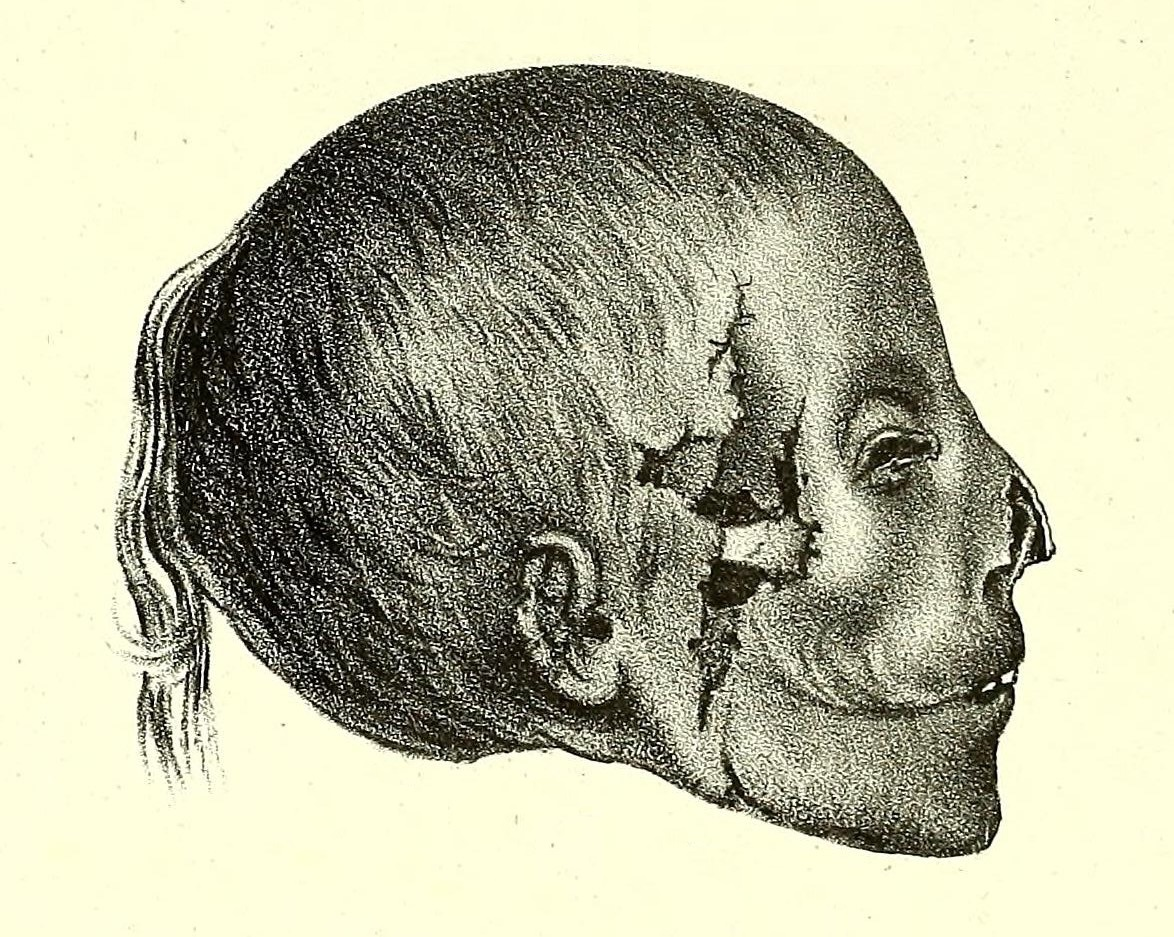
Only known depiction of any of the eleven mummies in the Michael Chandler collection. From the book Crania Aegyptica by Dr. Samuel Morton published in 1844. The skull currently resides in the University of Pennsylvania cranial collection.

Between April 1833 and June 1835, Michael Chandler toured the eastern United States, displaying and selling seven of the mummies as he went along. In April 1833, he displayed them first at the masonic hall and then the arcade in Philadelphia. His display attracted large crowds wherever he went. The first complete mummy ever displayed to the public in the United States arrived just ten years earlier in 1823, and had set off a mania in the United States for mummies and Egypt. Chandler's exhibit of eleven mummies was the largest ever up to that point in the United States. While Chandler was in Philadelphia, a doctor named W. E. Horner gathered six other doctors and gave Chandler an unsolicited endorsement of his collection:

Having examined with considerable attention and deep interest, a number of Mummies from the catacombs, near Thebes, in Egypt, and now exhibited in the Arcade, we beg leave to recommend them to the observation of the curious inquirer on subjects of a period so long elapsed; probably not less than three thousand years ago. The features of some of these Mummies are in perfect expression.-The papyrus, covered with black or red ink, or paint, in excellent preservation, are very interesting. The undersigned, unsolicited by any person connected by interest with this exhibition, have voluntarily set their names hereunto, for the simple purpose of calling the attention of the public to an interesting collection, not sufficiently known in this city.

Chandler had this "Certificate of the Learned" made into a placard that was circulated wherever he went, including two years later when he arrived in Kirtland, Ohio. After Philadelphia, the unsold six mummies along with the papyri moved on to Baltimore during July and August 1833. They stayed at the Baltimore Museum, and proved to be very popular. Chandler expanded his stay there from a planned two weeks to five weeks. The following advertisement appeared in several newspapers, placed by the manager of the museum:

The citizens are respectfully informed that the Manager has received from the vicinity of Thebes, that celebrated city of Ancient Egypt, six strangers, illustrious from their antiquity, count, probably an existence of at least one thousand years anterior to the advent of our blessed Saviour, and contemporaries; if so, of the first Sovereigns of Israel, viz: Saul and David. They are by no means insignificant aspirants to public patronage.

The next documented location of the exhibit was Lancaster, Pennsylvania in late August and then Harrisburg, Pennsylvania in September 1833. They were in Pittsburgh for four weeks during October and November 1833, and at the Western Museum in Cincinnati in December. In January 1834, they stayed in Louisville for a few days. In April and early May, they were shown at the corner of Chartres and St. Louis Streets in New Orleans. From May 1834 until February 1835, there is no known record of their whereabouts. In February 1835, Chandler displayed the mummies in Hudson, Ohio, just 30 miles south of Kirtland, Ohio, and the next month they were displayed in Cleveland.

While in Cleveland, a reporter from the Cleveland Whig published in March 1835 a description of the collection:

The relic forms are of three males and one female-of mature age, and two of them at least, evidently far advanced in life at the period of their deaths. ...There was found deposited in the arms of the old man referred to above, a book of ancient form and construction, which, to us, was by far the most interesting part of the exhibition. Its leaves were of bark, in length some 10 or 12 inches and 3 or 4 in width. The ends are somewhat decayed, but at the centre the leaves are in a state of perfect preservation. ...There is another book, more decayed, and much less neatly written.

A letter to the editor of the Painesville Telegraph for 27 March 1835 described the collection in depth:

No. 1-4 feet 11 inches, female-supposed age 60; ... There was found with this person a roll or book having a little resemblance to birch bark; ... ink black and red, many female figures.

No. 2-Height 5 ft 1 1-2 inch; female, suppose age 40. found with roll as no. 1, filled with hieroglyphics, rudely executed.
No. 3-Heighth [sic] 4 ft 4 1-2-male, very old, say 80; ... had a roll of writing as no. 1 & 2; superior head, it will compare in the regions of the sentiments with any in our land; passions mild.

No. 4-Height 4 ft 9, female. I am inclined to put her age at about 20 or 25; others call her an old woman.

==== The seven mummies not sold to Joseph Smith ====
Only four of the seven mummies Chandler sold before he met Joseph Smith have a current known location. Two mummies were sold by Chandler in Philadelphia to Dr. Samuel George Morton (one of the seven doctors who provided an unsolicited endorsement), who bought them for Philadelphia's Academy of Natural Sciences. These were dissected by Dr. Morton in front of other Academy members. Dr. Morton was interested in phrenology, a pseudoscience popular at the time that sought to predict mental traits from the physical features of the cranium. He would remove the skulls from the body, fill each skull with buckshot, and then weigh the skull to determine the cavity size. Today, these two skulls reside in the University of Pennsylvania cranial collection.

In January 1834, while the mummies were in Louisville, Junius Brutus Booth, famous actor and father of John Wilkes Booth, purchased two of the mummies, one of which Booth said had two rows of teeth. Booth had intended to send them to President Andrew Jackson's Tennessee home, but after being told how rare the items were, gave them to John Varden, owner of the Washington Museum of Curiosities. Varden sold his collection to the National Museum of Natural History in 1841, where the mummies are most likely located.

Somewhere in Chandler's travels between his exhibitions in Philadelphia and Baltimore, his collection was reduced by three mummies. Coincidentally, in the spring of 1834, a museum opened in Detroit with three mummies, but was destroyed by fire in 1842. Though not conclusive, this is strong circumstantial evidence that they could be the same mummies from Chandler's collection.

=== Sale to Joseph Smith ===
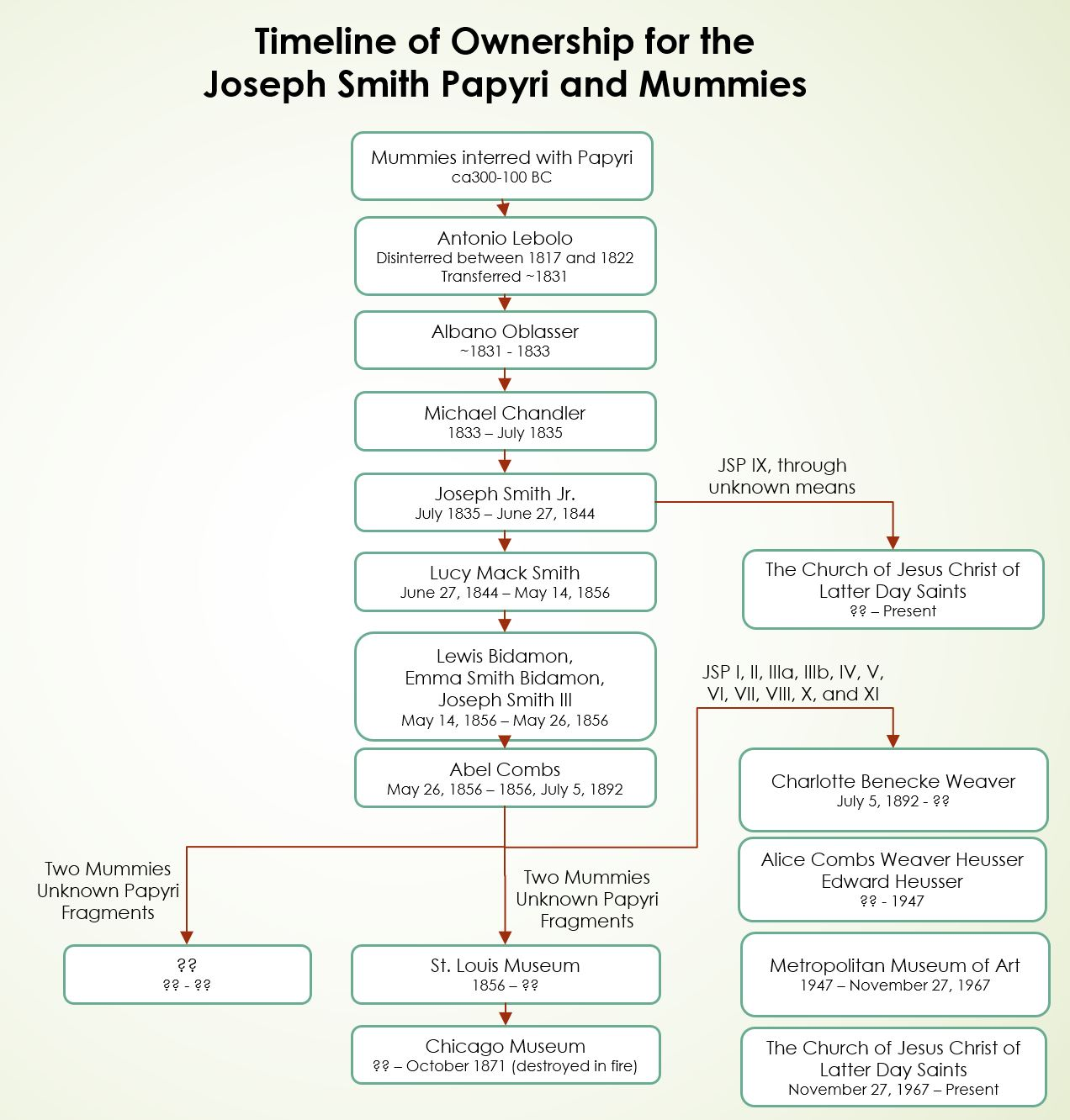
Timeline of the ownership of the Joseph Smith Papyri, as well as the mummies

Looking to make a sale, Chandler brought four mummies, two scrolls, and additional papyrus fragments to Kirtland, Ohio (then headquarters of the LDS Church) in late June or early July 1835. Upon entering a city to display his mummies, Chandler would post a placard or handbill around the town that speculated on the identity of the mummies: "These strangers illustrious from their antiquity, may have lived in the days of Jacob, Moses, or David." He stayed at the Riggs Hotel, and called on Joseph Smith in the evening of his arrival. Busy with a commitment that evening, Smith agreed to meet with Chandler the following morning. Joseph Smith was allowed to take the papyrus home, and the next morning returned them with a short translation of some characters copied down by Oliver Cowdery (see Notebooks of Copied Egyptian Characters). On July 6, 1835, Chandler produced a certificate authenticating Joseph Smith's translation:

This is to make known to all who may be desirous, concerning the knowledge of Mr. Joseph Smith, jr, in deciphering the ancient Egyptian hierogliphic characters, in my possession, which I have, in many eminent cities, shown to the most learned: And, from the information that I could ever learn, or meet with, I find that of Mr. Joseph Smith, jr. to correspond in the most minute matters.

Given the state of Egyptian scholarship at that time (Champollion's breakthrough Egyptian Grammar would not be published in Europe until 1836, and dictionary until 1841), it is unlikely that Chandler could so authoritatively make such a claim. According to Brigham Young University professor H. Donl Peterson, "At best, [American academicians] could only speculate on the meaning of some of the symbols when they could reach consensus on them."

Shortly after receiving this certification, Joseph Smith, Joseph Coe, and Simeon Andrews purchased the four mummies and at least five papyrus documents for $2,400, equivalent to $74,903 in 2025. Joseph Smith wanted to purchase only the papyri, but Chandler would not sell the papyri without the mummies. (Note: Orson Pratt stated in 1878: The Prophet Joseph having learned the value of the ancient writings was very anxious to obtain them, and expressed himself willing to purchase them. But Chandler told him he would not sell the writings unless he could sell the mummies, for it would detract from the curiosity of his exhibition. Orson Pratt, in Journal of Discourses, 25 Aug. 1878, 20:65. Coe later remembered that Smith's reason for purchasing the Egyptian artifacts was to produce a translation of the papyri. (J. Coe to JS, 1 Jan. 1844.)) This was a significant expense for the church, which at the same time was also constructing an expensive temple, and caring for many financially destitute immigrants. Joseph Coe wrote in an 1844 letter to Joseph Smith about how the funds were raised in this financially difficult time:

I was some-what involved, and unable to sustain a heavier burthen any great length of time. but having all confidence in the utility of the collection, and being assured by yourself that the burthen would be but temporary; that the profits arising from the work when translated would be more than adequate to the defraying all the expence which might accrue by the purchase. I therefore managed the business in relation to the purchase with the same confidence that I had previously done business which I thought would result in the good of the church. Previous to closing the contrat with [Michael] Chandler I made arangements with S. Andrews for to take one third part and yourself & Co. one third leaving one third to be borne by myself. Andrews soon paid his $800 I took $800 out of Geauga Bank which paid a large portion of my share.

=== The Collection in Kirtland ===
The latter half of 1835 Joseph Smith and his scribes Cowdery, Phelps, Frederick G. Williams, and Warren Parrish spent studying the scrolls and translating the first part of the Book of Abraham. It appears that, from late July to at least October, Frederick G. Williams was in possession of the mummies, and, according to one antagonistic newspaper, had begun to tour with them. The Cleveland Whig reported, "Williams has commenced traveling about the country, and will, no doubt, gull multitudes into a belief of the truth." A Cincinnati newspaper reported that the tour was unsuccessful: "The mummies were soon sent out for exhibition by one of their apostles, but being unsuccessful, he brought them back to Kirtland and threw them aside. There is reason to believe, that many who come here with high expectations, have met with sore disappointments."

In January 1836, work on the translation of the papyri stopped, as Joseph Smith focused on other projects and events, such as the building of the Kirtland Temple, learning Hebrew, and administering a growing church. On February 17, 1836, Joseph Coe was given the mummies and papyri to show and earn money. He hired a room at John Johnson's inn to exhibit them. The west room on the top floor of the Kirtland Temple was set aside as a translation room, and by August 1836, the papyri had been transferred there. On November 2, 1837, Phinehas Richards and Reuben Hedlock were appointed for "procuring means to translate and print the records taken from the Catacombs of Egypt, then in the Temple." Hedlock would go on in 1842 to carve the woodcuts to the printing plates that became the Book of Abraham facsimiles.

==== Mounting of the papyri ====
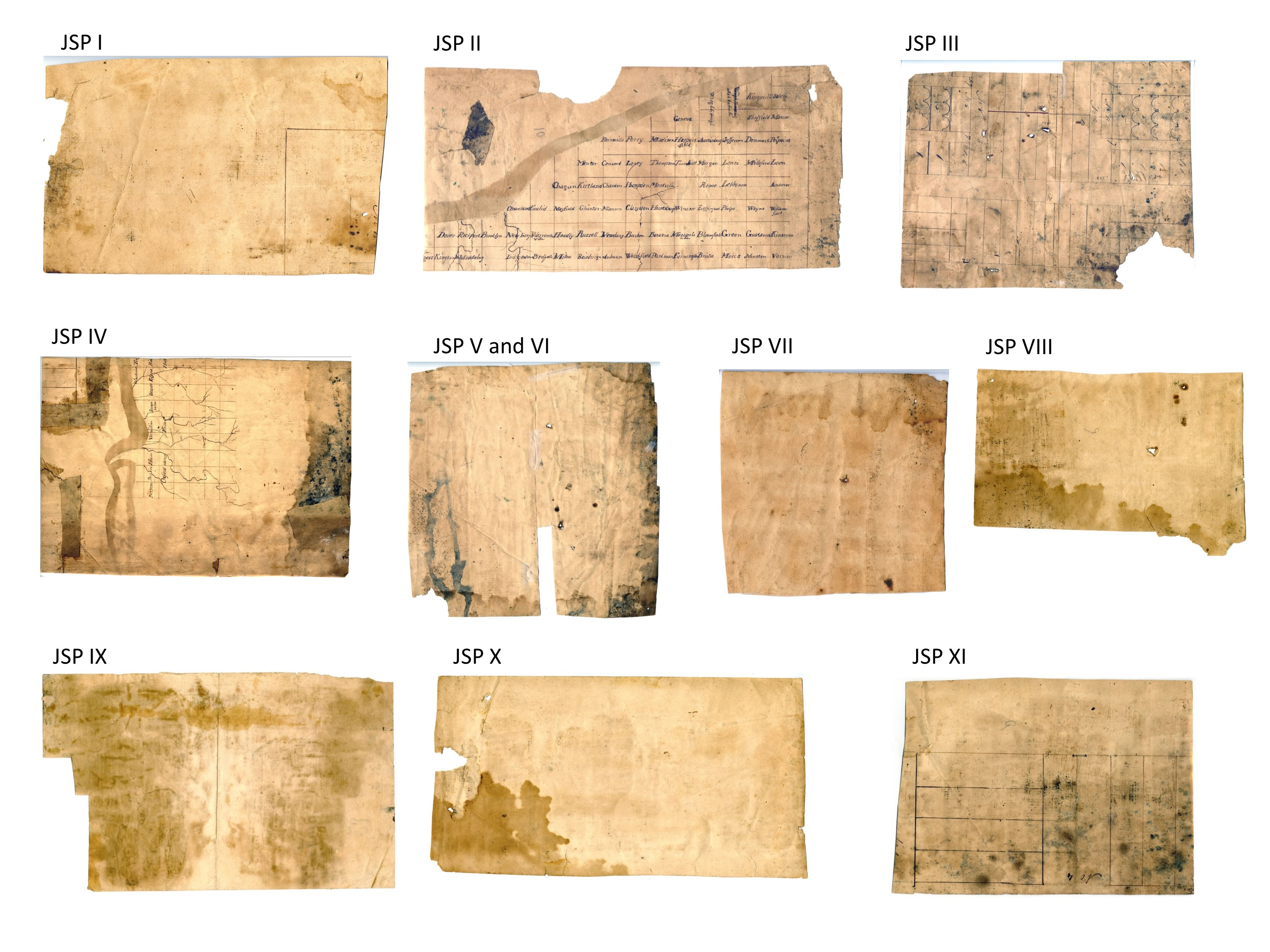
Backside of the mounted Joseph Smith Papyri, not to scale. Paper on which it was mounted included the Kirtland Temple and map of northern Ohio.

Sometime before spring of 1838 (probably late 1837), at least some of the papyri were cut up, pasted onto paper, and some mounted under glass in frames. Presumably this was to preserve the papyri, as continuous unrolling and handling of ancient scrolls would take a toll. Papyrus fragments I and II suffered damage, and patches had begun to fall off. At least forty-seven of these patches were pasted onto completely separate and unrelated areas on papyrus fragments IV, V, X, VIII, and IX.

Some of the paper the papyri were mounted on contained plans for the Kirtland Temple and maps of northern Ohio. Even though the papyri would be better preserved if the paper backing were removed, doing so would destroy important historical documents. Church Historian Robin Jensen commented on the dilemma:

These are very important documents for the LDS Church. Here we have the papyri themselves, both ancient documents, also nineteenth century documents in the sense that they really made a mark, they were part of LDS history, and to divide the ancient context with the nineteenth century context proves difficult.

==== Kirtland turmoil ====
The year 1837 was a chaotic time in Kirtland with an estimated 10–15% of the church withdrawing membership. The Kirtland Safety Society had failed, and many who had lost significant sums of money channeled their anger at Joseph Smith. This culminated with Smith fleeing in the middle of the night on January 12, 1838, leaving the mummies and papyri behind. Lucy Mack Smith recalled the troubling time later in life:

The first movement was to sue Joseph for debt, and, with this pretense, seize upon every piece of property belonging to any of the family. Joseph then had in his possession four Egyptian mummies, with some ancient records that accompanied them. These the mob swore they would take, and then burn every one of them. Accordingly, they obtained an execution upon them for an unjust debt of fifty dollars; but by various stratagems, we succeeded in keeping them out of their hands.

Where the mummies and papyri were and when is murky during the next few months and years. It appears that the mummies and papyri were at one point in possession of the now dissident Warren Parrish, and possibly Joseph Coe. A perplexing legal document signed by Joseph Smith Jr. on January 4, 1838 titled, "Article of Agreement Between Joseph Smith Jun. and Joseph Smith Sr." reads, "I convey the two undivided thirds of records of and box Exclusive of the mummies. ... I do hereby relinquish on the box and records which James Markell has Levied in my favor as the property of J. Smith Jr. and my claim on the same." A Markell family story related in the 1960s to LDS Church historians states, "Some one, if I remember correctly, related to Joseph Coe got the Records (Papyrus) and these Markells of mine were foxey enough to conn this fellow out of them. It seems he owed Judge Markell some money and Uncle James was deputized to help retrieve the records. It was quite a joke in the family."

The mummies and papyri were hid with the William Huntington family for a time, even hidden under teenage Zina Huntington's bed. When Huntington left to join the rest of the church in Missouri, the mummies and papyri were sent to a different family. Edwin D. Woolley and his brother Samuel "hired a wagon to bring the mummies and the Record of Abraham, etc" to Far West, Missouri.

=== The collection in Missouri ===
The LDS Church faced difficult times in 1838 and 1839, including expulsion from Missouri, Joseph Smith being jailed, and relocating its headquarters to Nauvoo, Illinois. As such, information about the location of the mummies and papyri over the next two years is scant. William Swartzell described seeing the mummies in his journal, which he later published as an anti-Mormon pamphlet. The May 24, 1838 entry states that he saw "Joseph Smith's box of mummies" in Richmond Landing. In his July 26, 1838 entry he writes that he saw men gathering logs for Joseph Smith's house, "in which he intends translating the heiroglyphics [sic] of the Egyptian Mummies." Anson Call recalled decades later that Oliver Cowdery read the Book of Abraham for several hours while at John Corrill's store in Far West (Cowdery was not a member in good standing, and it is doubtful he was part of this group).

On October 27, 1838, after the governor of Missouri issued the Extermination Order to expel the state of "Mormons", Joseph Smith moved his parents to Quincy, Illinois, who took the mummies and papyri with them.

=== The collection in Nauvoo ===
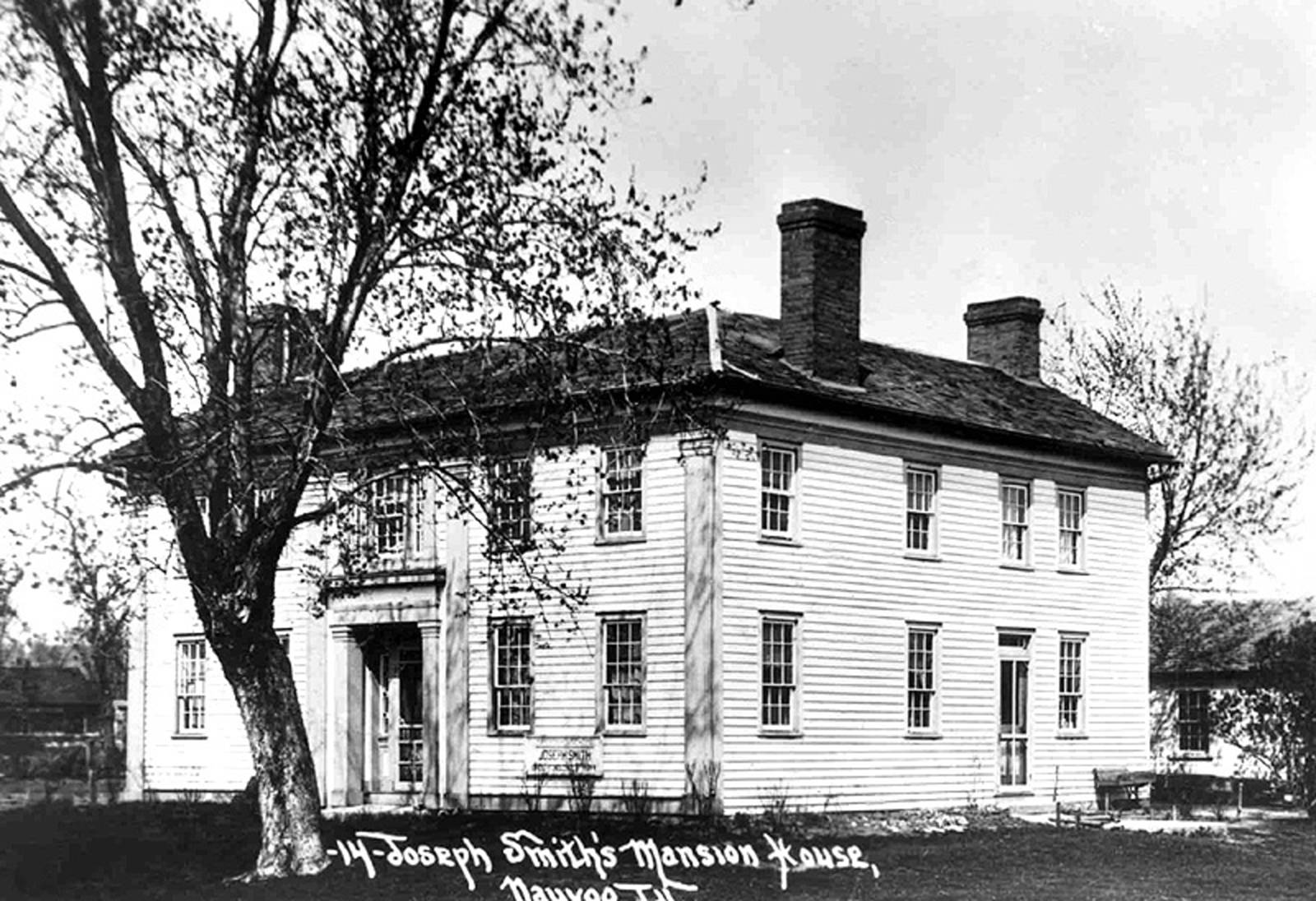
Mansion House in Nauvoo, one of the locations where the mummies and papyri were housed

By 1840, the mummies and papyri had arrived in Nauvoo, Illinois. On June 20, 1840, Joseph Smith asked to be relieved of temporal duties to "engage more particularly in the spiritual welfare of the saints and also, to the translation of the Egyptian Records." Between March and May 1842, Smith published his translation of the Book of Abraham in the Times and Seasons, promising that more would be released.

The collection was first located on the second floor of Joseph Smith's log cabin. Elizabeth Clements Kimball, a young girl living in Nauvoo, described seeing them: "The mummies were kept in the attic where they wouldn't be destroyed and in those days there weren't any stairways in the houses such as we have now, and in order to get to the attic one had to climb a ladder which was straight up along the wall." (Note: From an account written by her daughter. The full account states: "She was very thrilled at the thought and of course very curious, but she felt it a great privilege to be allowed to see them. The mummies were kept in the attic where they wouldn't be destroyed and in those days there weren't any stairways in the houses such as we have now, and in order to get to the attic one had to climb a ladder which was straight up along the wall. She told Joseph in a very timid voice that she would like to see them, but was a little frightened while climbing the ladder to the attic. But when at the top she saw the room with the curious looking things, and Joseph seeing she was a little frightened stepped to her side, laid his hand on her shoulder and said, "come little one, do not be afraid". He took her by the hand and led her to them saying, "touch them and you will never be afraid of the dead". It was then that he placed his hands on her shoulder and head and gave her a blessing. He told her that when she grew up she would be a nurse and would care for the sick and the dead all her life.") In April 1840, a reporter from the Quincy Whig wrote an article describing his visit to Nauvoo, and seeing the mummies and papyri:

[Joseph Smith] conducted us, at our request, to an upper room, where he drew aside the curtains of a case; and showed us several Egyptian Mummies. ... The embalmed body that stands near the centre of the case, said he, is one of the Pharaohs, who sat upon the throne of Egypt; and the female figure by its side was probably one of the daughters. It may have been the Princess Thermutis, I replied, the same that rescued Moses from the waters of the Nile. It is not improbable, answered the Prophet; but my time has not yet allowed me fully to examine and decide that point. ... He then walked to a secretary, on the opposite side of the room, and drew out several frames, covered with glass, under which were numerous fragments of Egyptian papyras, on which, as usual, a great variety of hieroglyphical characters had been imprinted. These ancient records, said he, throw great light on the subject of Christianity. They have been unrolled and preserved with great labor and care. My time has been hithertoo too much taken up to translate the whole of them, but I will show you how I interpret certain parts. There, said he, pointing to a particular character, that is the signature of the patriarch Abraham. It is indeed a most interesting autograph, I replied, and doubtless the only one extant.

By February 19, 1843, they had moved to the cabin of Lucy Mack Smith, the mother of Joseph Smith. (Note: "On 19 February 1843, a girl by the name of Charlotte Haven visited the Smiths, and left this account of another visit to the mummies, who were at that time residing in their second Nauvoo home, the cabin of Lucy Mack Smith, the Prophet's mother.") Lucy began to take the lead on displaying the mummies, a way to support her in her old age, charging 25 cents for admission. It appears that the body of at least one of the mummies had begun to deteriorate. Charlotte Haven, a young girl who visited Nauvoo, wrote to her mother, "[Madame Smith] took up what seemed to be a club wrapped in a dark cloth, and said "This is the leg of pharaoh's daughter, the one who saved Moses." The St. Louis Evening Gazette reported, "In addition to the mummies that were intact, there were some fragments of others, including a limb of that Pharaoh's daughter who rescued Moses when he had been exposed to the crocodiles in the bulrushes of the Nile. The mummies themselves, we were told with the same assurance, were great monarchs, pharaohs, kings, and queens of Egypt! Two were in perfect condition, but the other two were badly mutilated. The skull of one was fractured and a piece of the chest had been torn from the other."

By September 1843, the collection was moved to the Mansion House in Nauvoo.

=== After Joseph Smith's death ===
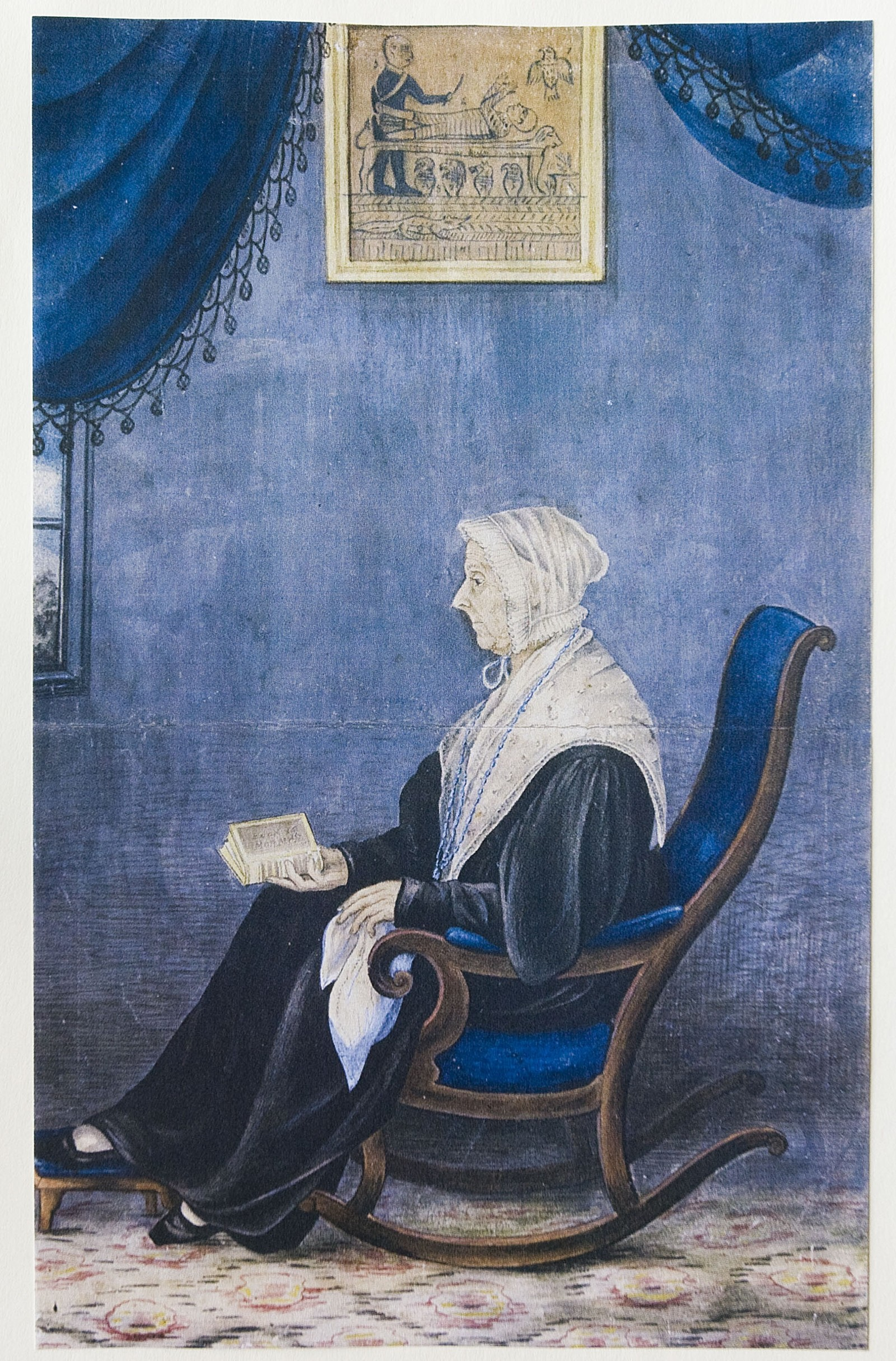
Portrait of Lucy Mack Smith in Nauvoo. Note the Facsimile #1 from the published Book of Abraham in the background.

After the death of Joseph Smith on June 27, 1844, the church split apart into multiple factions. Ownership of church property became a matter of confusion, as the church was "organized", rather than "incorporated", with Joseph Smith being the trustee-in-trust for all church property. William Smith, Joseph Smith's brother, seems to have taken control of the mummies and papyrus at this time. In two letters dated 2 and 19 December 1846, William asked James Strang, a leader of one of the factions vying for leadership of the church, for help transporting the mummies and papyri to Voree, Wisconsin, where Strang had set up his faction's headquarters. The transportation to Voree never occurred.

Brigham Young took his faction of the church away from Nauvoo in 1846, leaving Almon W. Babbitt in charge of affairs there. Babbitt wrote to Young on January 31, 1848, "Uncle William has got the mummies from Mother Smith and refuses to give them up." Joseph Smith III later recollected that "Uncle William undertook a lecturing tour, and secured the mummies and case of records, as the papyrus was called, as an exhibit and aid to making his lectures more attractive and lucrative."

At some unknown point, the mummies and papyri were in the possession of Smith's mother, Lucy Mack Smith, who had moved in with Smith's widow Emma Smith. Mack Smith continued to display them to derive income. On May 25, 1856, just a couple of weeks after the death of Lucy Mack Smith, Emma sold "four Egyptian mummies with the records with them" to Abel Combs.

By August 1856, Combs himself had sold "two of [the] mummies, and some of the papyri" to the St. Louis Museum. Upon the closing of the St. Louis Museum in 1863, these artifacts were purchased by Col. J. H. Wood and found their way to his museum in Chicago. Wood was particularly proud of these objects and had them prominently displayed for all to see. Unfortunately, the museum and all its contents were destroyed in 1871 during the Great Chicago Fire. Today, it is presumed the papyri which formed the bases for Facsimiles 2 and 3 were lost in this inferno.

After the fire, it was believed that all the papyri sources for the book had been lost. Unbeknownst to most, Abel Combs still owned several papyri fragments and two mummies (the latter have disappeared). The papyri were given to Combs' nurse Charlotte Benecke Weaver upon his death on July 5, 1892, who in turn gave them to her daughter, Alice Combs Weaver Heusser.

A 1918 memorandum from the New York Metropolitan Museum of Art records that Heusser brought "eight or ten fragments of papyri" for inspection "in connection with the effort made by Bishop Spaulding of Utah about 1912 to obtain confirmation ... that Joseph Smith's supposed translations of sacred Egyptian texts on which he founded his 'Pearl of Great Price' were a fraud." Then, in late 1945, a curator at the museum noticed the memorandum and tracked down Heusser's widower, Edward Heusser, making an offer for purchase of the papyri, which was accepted in 1946. (Note: Ritner puts the date in 1947, but cites Peterson, who puts the date at 1946.)

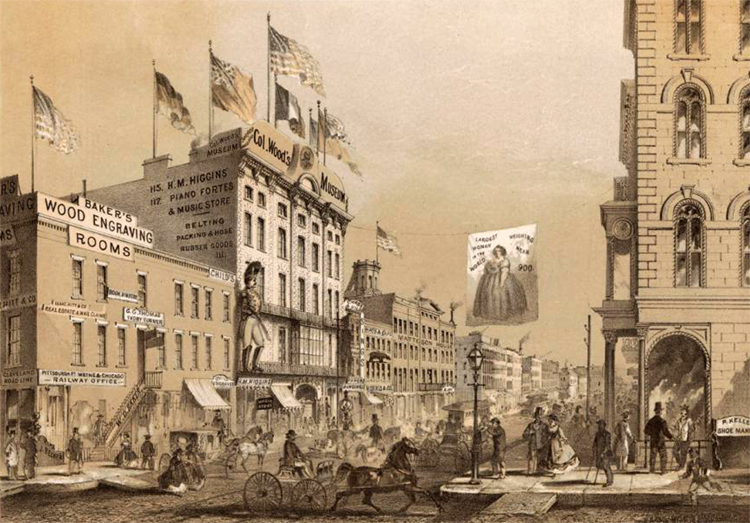
Several pieces of papyri were purchased by Col. John H. Wood and moved to his museum in Chicago (pictured), where they were presumably lost during the Great Chicago Fire in 1871.

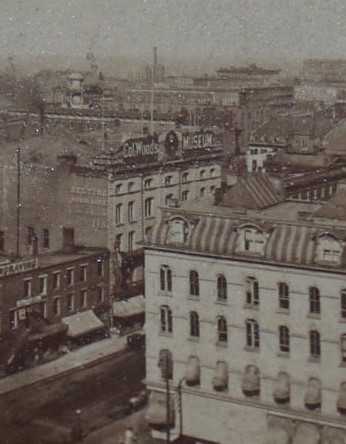
Col. Wood's Museum before the Great Chicago fire of 1871

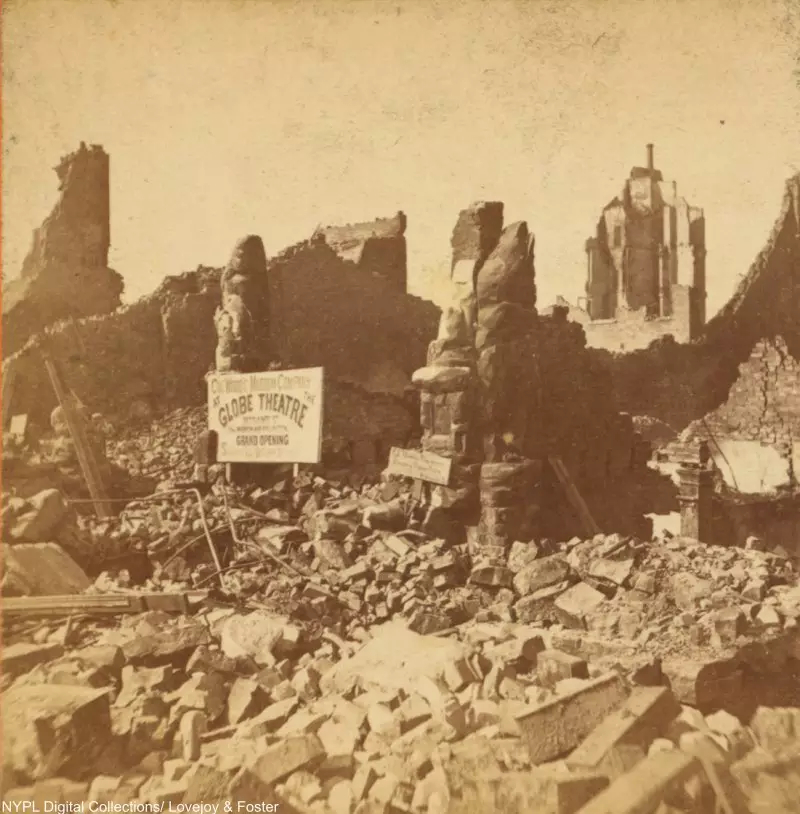
Col. Wood's Museum after the Great Chicago fire of 1871

=== Rediscovery ===
It was widely believed that the entire collection had perished in the Chicago fire. In the mid-1960s, the Metropolitan Museum of Art decided to sell some of its collection. In May 1966, Henry George Fischer, curator of the Egyptian Collection, approached Aziz Suryal Atiya, a visiting scholar from the University of Utah, and asked if he would be an intermediary between the museum and the LDS Church, to see if the church would be interested in purchasing their ten fragments. Fischer stated that an anonymous donation to the museum made it possible for the LDS Church to acquire the papyri.

On November 27, 1967, the LDS Church announced in a press release the discovery of the missing papyrus. The LDS Church published sepia tone photographs of the papyri in the February 1968 Improvement Era.

==== Controversy surrounding the discovery ====
The role played by Atiya in the discovery has been disputed. He characterized himself as the principal discoverer of the papyrus, relating the story in the Improvement Era as follows:

While I was in one of the dim rooms where everything was brought to me, something caught my eye, and I asked one of my assistants to take me behind the bars into the storehouse of documents so that I could look some more. While there I found a file with these documents. I at once recognized the picture part of it. When I saw this picture, I knew that it had appeared in the Pearl of Great Price. ... I consider it a great honor to have been able to make this discovery. Great discoveries are always accidental, and this one was as accidental as any discovery I have made—and probably more exciting than all of them. It was an honor to have been able to persuade such an august body as the Metropolitan Museum to present it to another body as august as the Mormon Church. I feel flattered to have been able to do what I did.

The Metropolitan Museum knew what the papyri were before Aziz Atiya visited. The museum acquisition list for 1947 states "papyrus fragments of hieratic Books of the Dead, once the property of the Mormon leader Joseph Smith." Museum curator Henry Fischer responded in a letter to Atiya:

Although I was already aware that your version of the discovery of these documents had caused considerable confusion, it was startling to read that you had informed me of their existence. While I have taken pains to avoid any outright contradictions of what you said, I do not see why either I or the other members of my department—past and present—should be put in the position of being ignorant about facts we could not fail to have known.

Scholars conclude that the recovered papyri are portions of the originals partly based on the fact that the fragments were pasted onto paper which had "drawings of a temple and maps of the Kirtland, Ohio area" on the back and were accompanied by an affidavit by Emma Smith stating that they had been in the possession of Joseph Smith.

=== Discovery of the Church Historian's fragment ===
In addition to the ten fragments that were discovered at the Metropolitan Museum, another fragment was located. In the same article in the February 1968 issue of the Improvement Era that contained the near full size sepia color reproductions of the papyri, Jay M. Todd, editorial associate for the magazine, discussed the discovery of a fragment which had been stored with the manuscript of the Egyptian Alphabet and Grammar and had been in the Church Historian's archives since at least 1908. Todd referenced an entry in the Church Historian's Office files dated Wednesday, October 17, 1855, describing several items which were being transferred to the newly constructed Historian's Office, including "three plates of the Book of Abraham" and a "red box with papers, blanks, journal, stereotype and plates".

Todd went on to discuss an entry from a personal journal dated Saturday, July 11, 1846, describing a meeting between "Brigham Young and the Brethren" and "Chief Banquejappa of the Pottawatomie [sic] tribe" during which the Chief gave Brigham Young "two sheets of hieroglyphics from the Book of Abraham" and a letter dated 1843 that had been given to them by Joseph Smith. Todd referred to the background of the Historian's fragment as "most puzzling", and stated that William Lund and Earl Olsen, assistant Church Historians, did not recall any information about the fragment except that it had been there with the Egyptian Alphabet and Grammar throughout their service, which dated to 1911.

The Church Historian's fragment was labeled IX by Hugh Nibley and appears on page 40-H of the Improvement Era article, with the image heading; "IX. Church Historian's fragment" and the text:

With our readers, the staff of The Improvement Era will be looking forward with eager anticipation to additional developments in this fascinating story, and the unfolding of the meaning of the hieroglyphics and illustrations on these valuable manuscripts as they are given by Dr. Nibley in his articles.

== Joseph Smith on papyri handwriting and the identity of the mummies ==
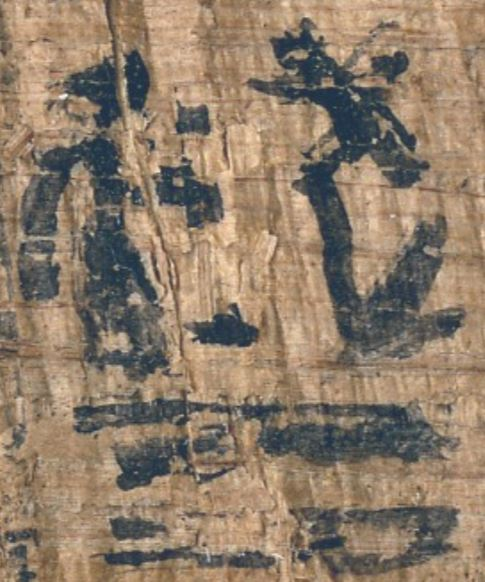
Character from the papyri identified by Joseph Smith as the hieroglyph for "Abraham"

Joseph Smith taught that the two rolls were literally written by the Ancient Patriarchs Abraham and Joseph. Independent sources have him pointing to places on the papyri and identifying various hieroglyphics as the signature of Abraham.

The accounts from eyewitnesses consistently maintain that Smith presented the mummies as those of a Pharaoh and his royal household. Most commonly, Smith and his mother Lucy Mack Smith referred to them as Pharaoh Onitas, his wife, and their two daughters, one of whom was named Katumin. They said these names were obtained through revelation. Mack Smith would sometimes refer to one of the mummies as "Pharaoh's daughter, the one who saved Moses." One eyewitness wrote that he was told the Pharaoh's name was "Necho."

Based on where they were found, and the writings found on them, the mummies are not believed to have been Pharaohs, but priests and nobles from the Ptolemaic era of Egypt (323–30 BCE). No known Pharaohs or their family members have names that resemble "Onitus" or "Katumin." A Pharaoh Necho is known to have existed; however, he was buried in Sais, near the Nile Delta, far from where the mummies were excavated.

== Recovered and known fragments ==
In total, eleven papyrus fragments have been recovered, and are designated I, II, IIIa, IIIb, IV, V, VI, VII, VIII, X, and XI in the Improvement Era article. Other designations were given by the Metropolitan Museum of Art and various Egyptologists and scholars that analyzed the fragments. The designations established by the Improvement Era have remained the most commonly used numbering.

Some fragments were published in the Book of Abraham, but these portions of the papyri have not been recovered.

The table below summarizes different designation schemes:

Joseph Smith Papyri fragments
Description	Dimensions (at their largest)	JSP #	Met #	Wilson-Jeppson #s	Photograph
First Section of Breathing Permit of Hor	7 1/2 in × 4 in 19 cm × 10 cm	I	47.102.9	A (photo 1)	
Sixth Section of Book of the Dead for TaSheritMin	5 1/8 in × 10 1/2 in 13 cm × 27 cm	II	47.102.10	B (photo 8)	
Right side of vignette from Book of the Dead for Nefer-ir-nebu	9 5/8 in × 7 in 24 cm × 18 cm	IIIa	47.102.2	C (photo 5)	
Left side of vignette from Book of the Dead for Nefer-ir-nebu	10 1/8 in × 6 in 26 cm × 15 cm	IIIb	47.102.3	C (photo 6)	
Fifth Section of Book of the Dead for TaSheritMin	11 1/2 in × 8 in 29 cm × 20 cm	IV	47.102.1	B (photo 3)	
On the right hand side, the Third Section of Book of the Dead for TaSheritMin	11 1/4 in × 5 5/8 in 29 cm × 14 cm	V	47.102.4	B (photo 2)	
On the left hand side, the Fourth Section of the Book of the Dead for TaSheritMin	11 1/2 in × 5 1/2 in 29 cm × 14 cm	VI	47.102.7	B (photo 4)	
First Section of the Book of the Dead for TaSheritMin	Right Side: 5 in × 2 7/8 in 12.7 cm × 7.3 cm Left Side: 5 in × 3 in 12.7 cm × 7.6 cm	VII	47.102.5	B (photo 7)	
Second Section of the Book of the Dead for TaSheritMin	5 3/4 in × 6 1/2 in 15 cm × 17 cm	VIII	47.102.6	B (photo 9)	
Miscellaneous Scraps of the Book of the Dead for TaSheritMin	10 7/8 in–12 1/2 in × 3 in–7 3/7 in 27.6 cm–31.8 cm × 7.6 cm–18.9 cm	IX			
Third Section of Breathing Permit of Hor	11 3/4 in × 4 3/8 in 30 cm × 11 cm	X	47.102.8	D (photo 10)	
Second Section of Breathing Permit of Hor	6 3/4 in × 4 in 17 cm × 10 cm	XI	47.102.11	D (photo 11)	
Random Fragments					
Hypocephalus of Sheshonq (Facsimile #2)					
Closing Vignette of Breathing Permit of Hor (Facsimile #3)					

== The Book of Abraham Scroll or the Breathing Permit belonging to the priest Hôr ==
JSP I, X, XI, and Facsimile #3 can be reassembled to partially reconstruct the scroll containing the Breathing Permit, Book of Breathing or Sensen Text belonging to the priest Hôr (also known as Horus). Portions of the papyri from JSP X and XI were damaged, and re-pasted incorrectly into lacunae in JSP IV, but do not belong to JSP IV. The handwriting was identified as being "of the late Ptolemaic or early Roman Period, about the time of Christ". Jan Quaegebeur has suggested a date in the first half of the second century BC.

This scroll is widely believed by both Mormon and non-Mormon scholars to be the scroll from which the Book of Abraham came. This is based on the inclusion of Facsimile #1 (JSP I) and #3 from this scroll in the Book of Abraham, and titled by Joseph Smith as "from the Book of Abraham". Further evidence is that characters from this scroll were sequentially copied into the Book of Abraham translation manuscripts. The official position taken by the LDS church on the papyri is that "Mormon and non-Mormon Egyptologists agree that the characters on the fragments do not match the translation given in the book of Abraham." Given this, some Mormon apologists have postulated that the Book of Abraham manuscript was appended to the end of this scroll, and is no longer extant. The evidence for this claim is 1840s and 1850s accounts from visitors to Nauvoo who viewed the papyri after they had been separated and framed.

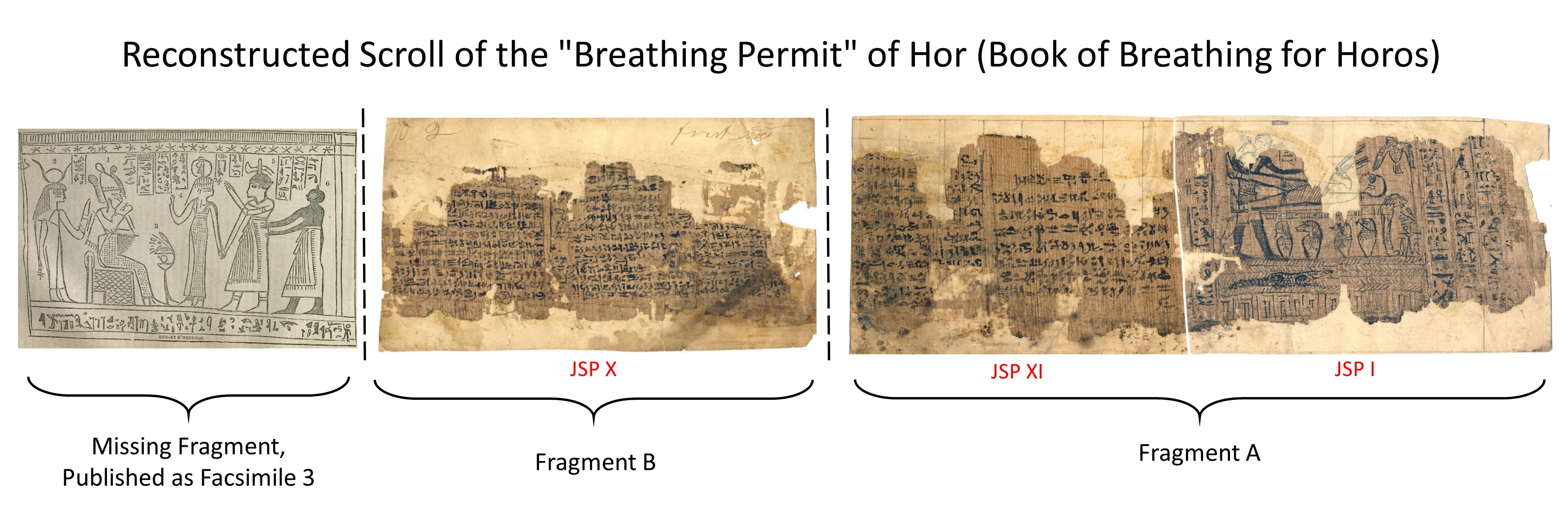
Reconstruction of the remaining fragments of the "Breathing Permit" of Hor (Book of Breathing for Horos). Facsimile 3 is believed to be the end of the "Breathing Permit", and hence the end of the scroll. There are about two columns of missing text from the Breathing Permit after Fragment B. The scroll is read from right to left.

By taking the length of current fragments, and estimating how much space would have been taken by the missing section of the Book of Breathing, the size of the scroll has been estimated to be between 150 and 156 cm (59 and 61 in).

The length of the scroll and the possibility that the Book of Abraham could have been appended to the end of it have been the source of great controversy and much research. It is not uncommon for texts to be appended to funerary rolls, however a non-funerary text would be unique. The length of the scroll can also be estimated by looking at recurring damage caused by scroll windings, but even this has been debated. The editors of the LDS Church-funded Joseph Smith Papers project favored the shorter scroll theory, by relegating the longer scroll estimates to speculative footnotes (see: Controversy surrounding the length of the Hôr scroll).

=== Comparison of Joseph Smith Papyrus I with other similar vignettes ===
As of 1998, there were twenty-nine known examples of the Book of Breathings, of which the Joseph Smith papyri fragment is an example. Of those twenty-nine, eighteen have vignettes associated with them. Although no two facsimiles are completely identical, there are common features among all. A comparison of the Book of Abraham facsimiles with these other documents indicates that, although the Book of Abraham Facsimile No. 1 (derived from JSP I) is unique, these differences are not significant enough to indicate that they are anything other than a representation of an Egyptian re-animation scene from the Book of Breathing made by Isis.

=== Translation ===
The papyri have been translated several times by both Mormon and non-Mormon Egyptologists. Disagreements between translations are minor, and do not change the main theme of the document. The Breathing Permit begins with a preamble, an address to the deceased Hôr, introducing who he is, and wishing him a good burial east of Thebes.

The second section is an instruction to those caring for the body on how and when the Breathing Permit was to be placed on Hôr.

The last section is the main body of the breathing document. It contains ten paragraphs of various declarations of hope for a successful afterlife, as well as attestations of ultimate justification and further existence.

The document continues, but the remaining fragments are presumed not to have survived. The traditional Book of Breathing continues for another four paragraphs (paragraphs 11–14). These final paragraphs typically include continued discussion of Hôr entering the afterlife, an abbreviated Negative Confession where Hôr would proclaim before gods and demons that he had not committed a variety of sins, and, finally, a proclamation of Hôr's purity and readiness to live forever on earth. This would make up about two more columns.

==== Closing vignette (facsimile #3) ====
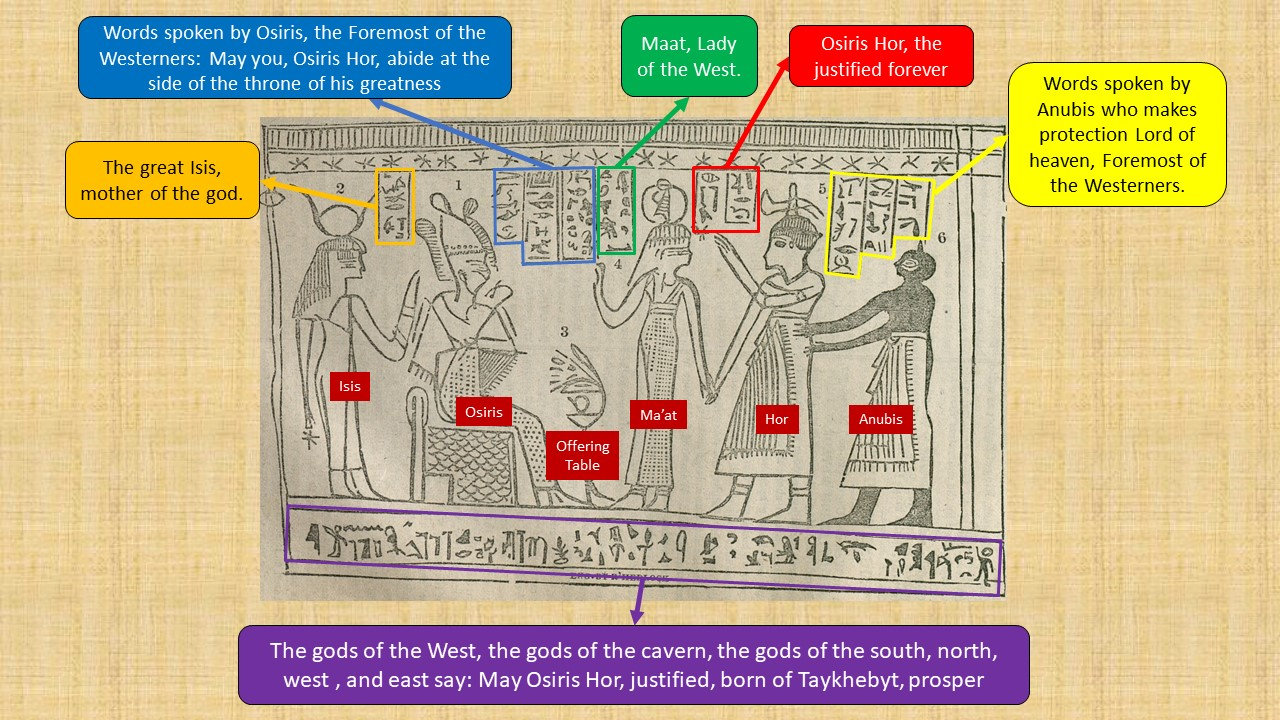
Translation of Book of Abraham Facsimile #3. The translation was done by Michael Rhodes, a member of the Church of Jesus Christ of Latter-day Saints.

The culminating vignette, also known as facsimile #3, is the presentation of Hor to the Egyptian god of death and rebirth Osiris (seated), and his wife Isis (standing) after having been judged worthy to continue existence. Hor is adorned in Egyptian festival attire with a cone of perfumed grease and a lotus flower on his head. He is escorted by the goddess of justice Ma'at, and guide of the dead Anubis. At the top of the scene is a row of stars, representing the sky. The presentation of the deceased to Osiris is a common scene in Egyptian funerary literature, and has its antecedent in chapter 125 of the earlier Book of the Dead.

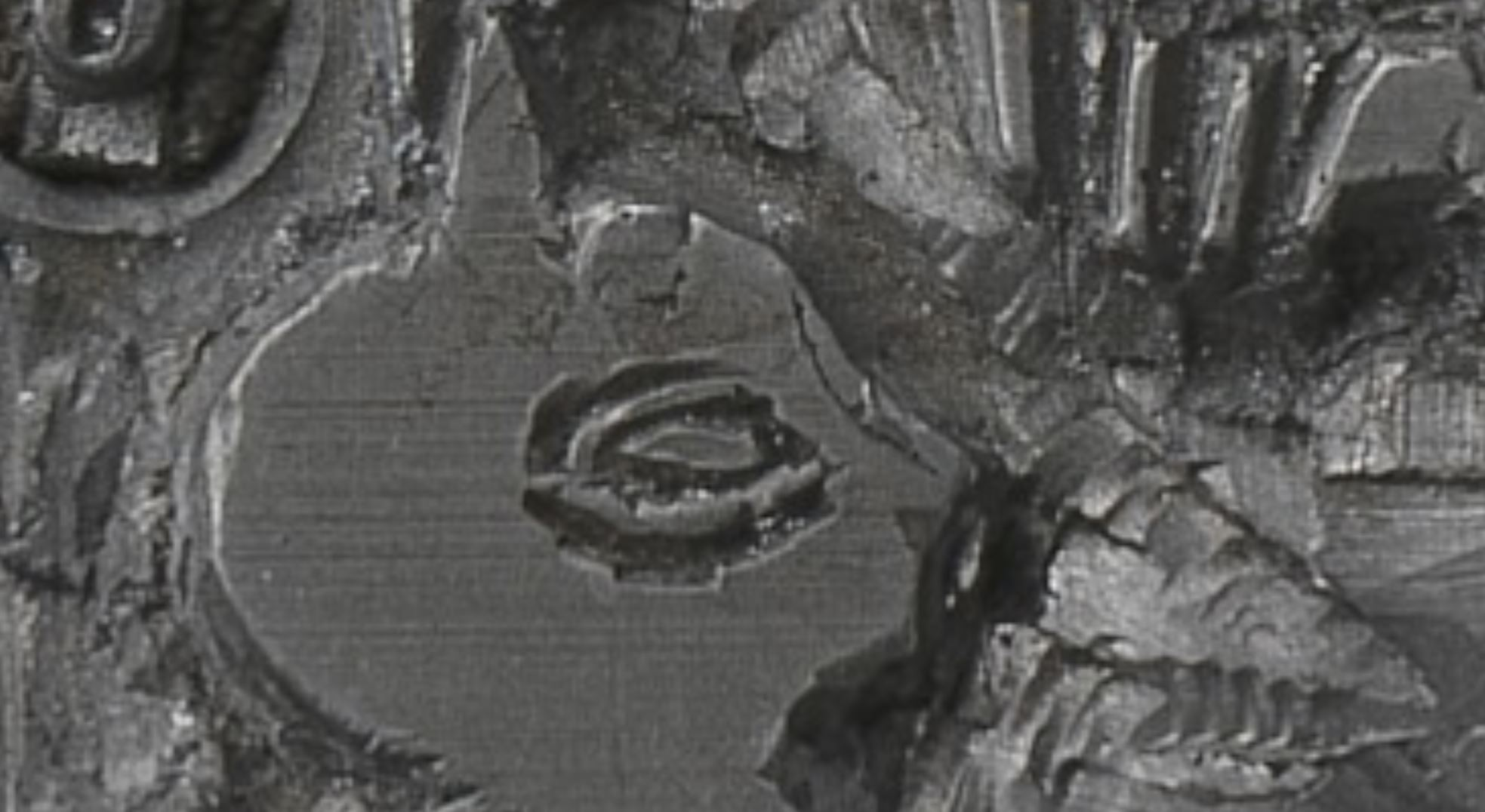
Anubis from the original printing plate, where it appears that the nose was scraped off

The Egyptian gods and goddesses in this vignette are identified by iconography above their heads. Osiris is adorned in the crown Atef which combines the Hedjet, the crown of Upper Egypt (where Thebes is located), with two ostrich feathers on the side. Isis has a sun disk between two cows horns above her head, and in her hand is a symbol of life called an Ankh. Ma'at is denoted by a feather above her head.

In Egyptian funerary tradition, the god Anubis is a guide to the dead, assisting in leading the deceased through the underworld. Anubis is typically portrayed with a jackal's head to include spiked ears, narrow eyes and long snout. While the spiked ear, and narrow eyes are present, the long snout is not. Close analysis of the printing plates of facsimile 3 indicates that the snout might have been present but chiseled off.

Interestingly, the invocation to Osiris at the bottom of the vignette reads from left to right, not right to left, and indicates the direction the prayer was going (from the direction of Hor/Anubis, to Osiris).

== Book of Joseph Scroll or Book of the Dead for TaSheritMin ==
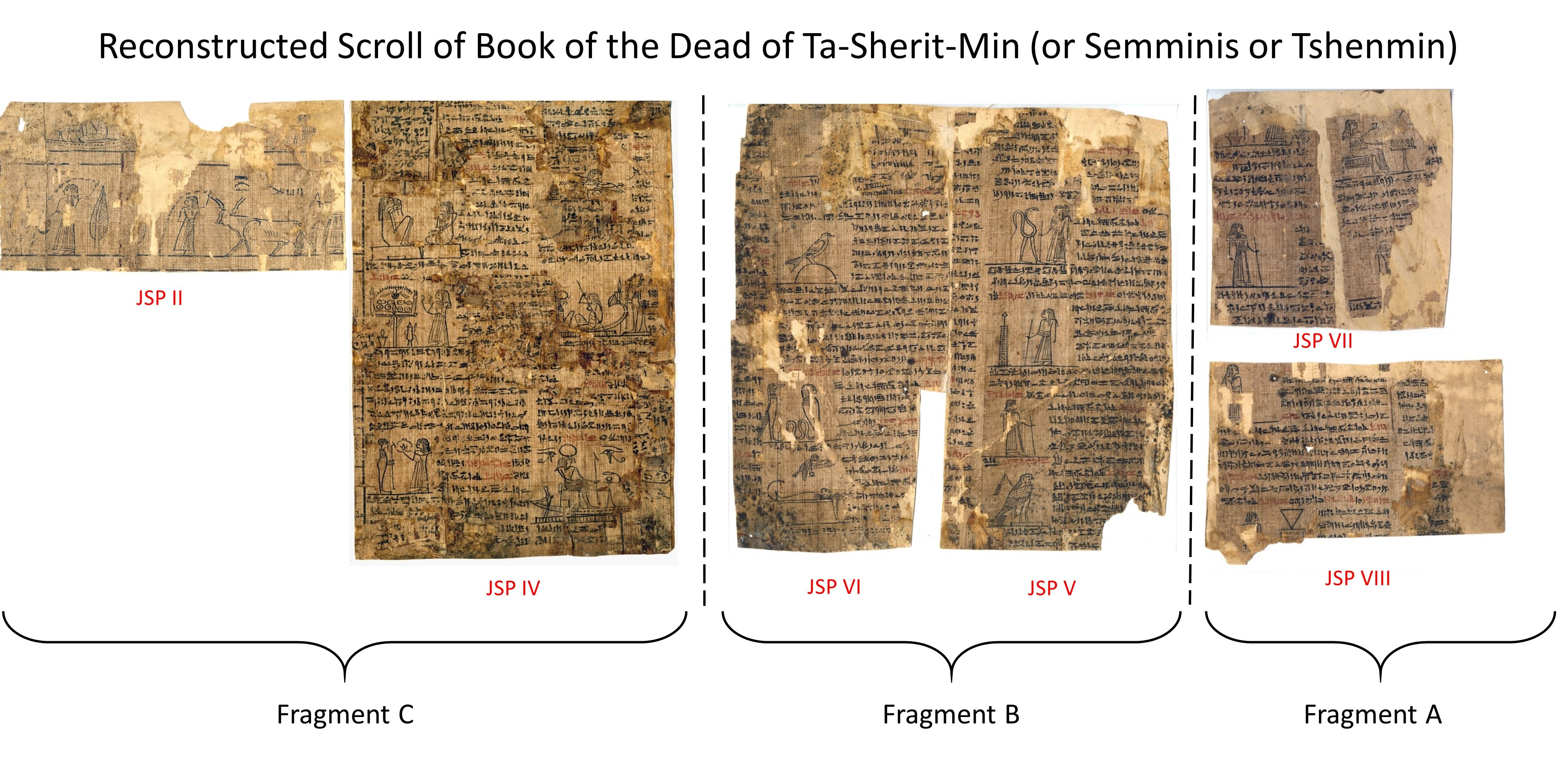

Papyri II, V–IX, and most of IV as "The Book of the Dead belong to the lady Ta-sherit-Min" (also Tshemmin, Semminis). Books of the Dead were used from around 1550 BCE to around 50 BCE. Like the Breathing Permit, the Book of the Dead assisted the deceased in navigating the afterlife. Unlike the Breathing Permit, the Book of the Dead was less standardized. Prospective deceased would pick and choose which spells (sometimes referred to as chapters) they wanted in their book to assist them, as such, there is a wide variance between different versions across its long history of use. While modern scholars have cataloged the spells, and given them numbers, these numbers are artificial and would have no meaning to ancient Egyptians.

The spell arrangement and textual variants are very similar to that of other early Ptolemaic era papyri, including the Ryerson Papyrus. The surviving portion of the Book of the Dead for Ta-sherit-Min includes all or portions of spells 1-7, 10-14, 16, 53-54, 57, 59(?), 63, 65, 67, 70, 72, 74-77, 83, 86-89, 91, 100-101, 103-106, 110 and 125. Portions of the text are only known because characters were copied down.

=== Description by Oliver Cowdery ===
Oliver Cowdery spoke of this papyrus scroll as "Joseph's record". In an 1835 letter he described various vignettes as follows:

The representation of the god-head--three, yet in one, is curiously drawn to give simply, though impressively, the writers views of that exalted personage. The serpent, represented as walking, or formed in a manner to be able to walk, standing in front of, and near a female figure, is to me, one of the greatest representations I have ever seen upon paper, or a writing substance; ... Enoch's Pillar, as mentioned by Josephus, is upon the same roll.

Vignettes from TaSheritMin scroll matching Oliver Cowdery's description

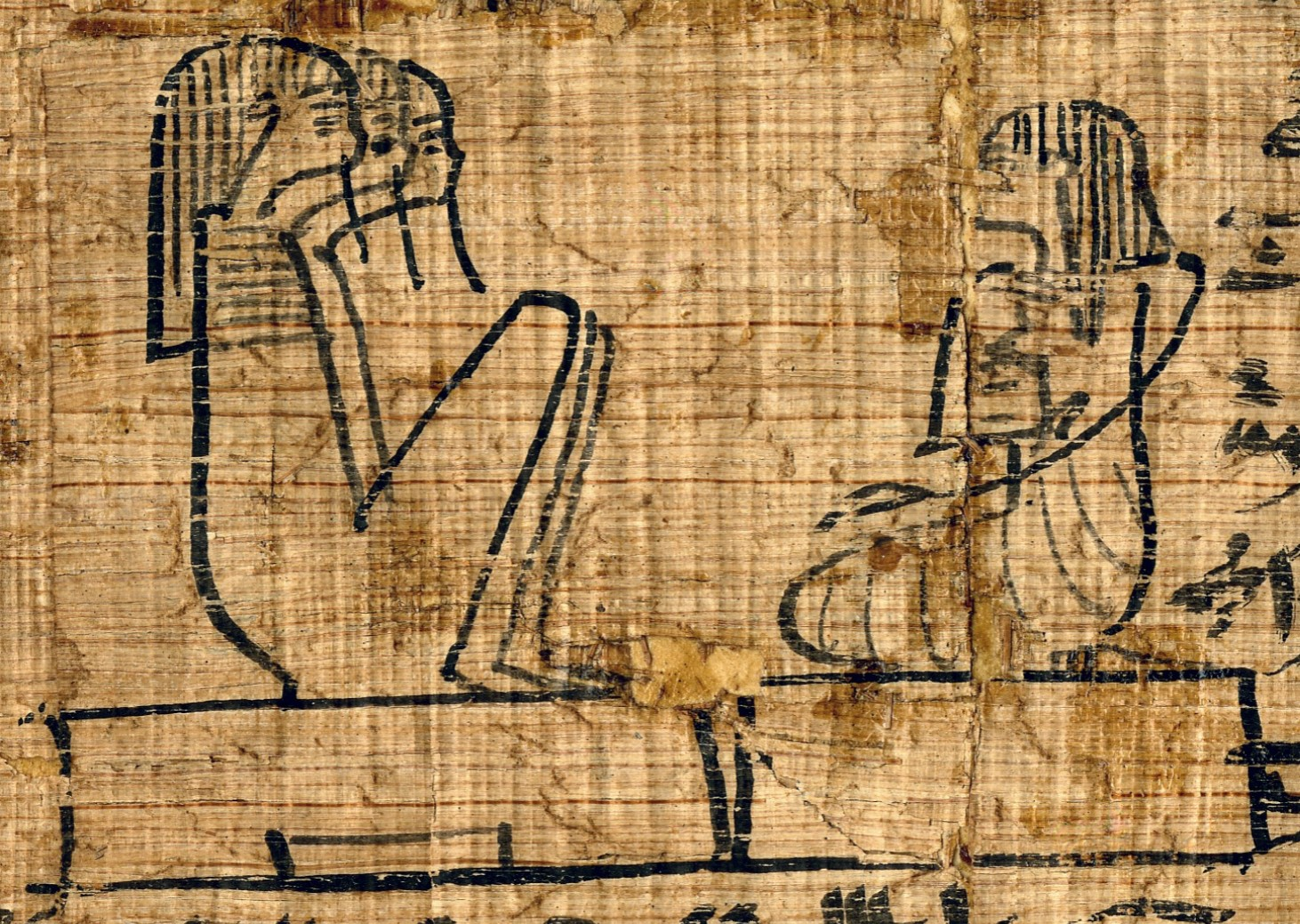
The deceased sitting on a mat before three Gods

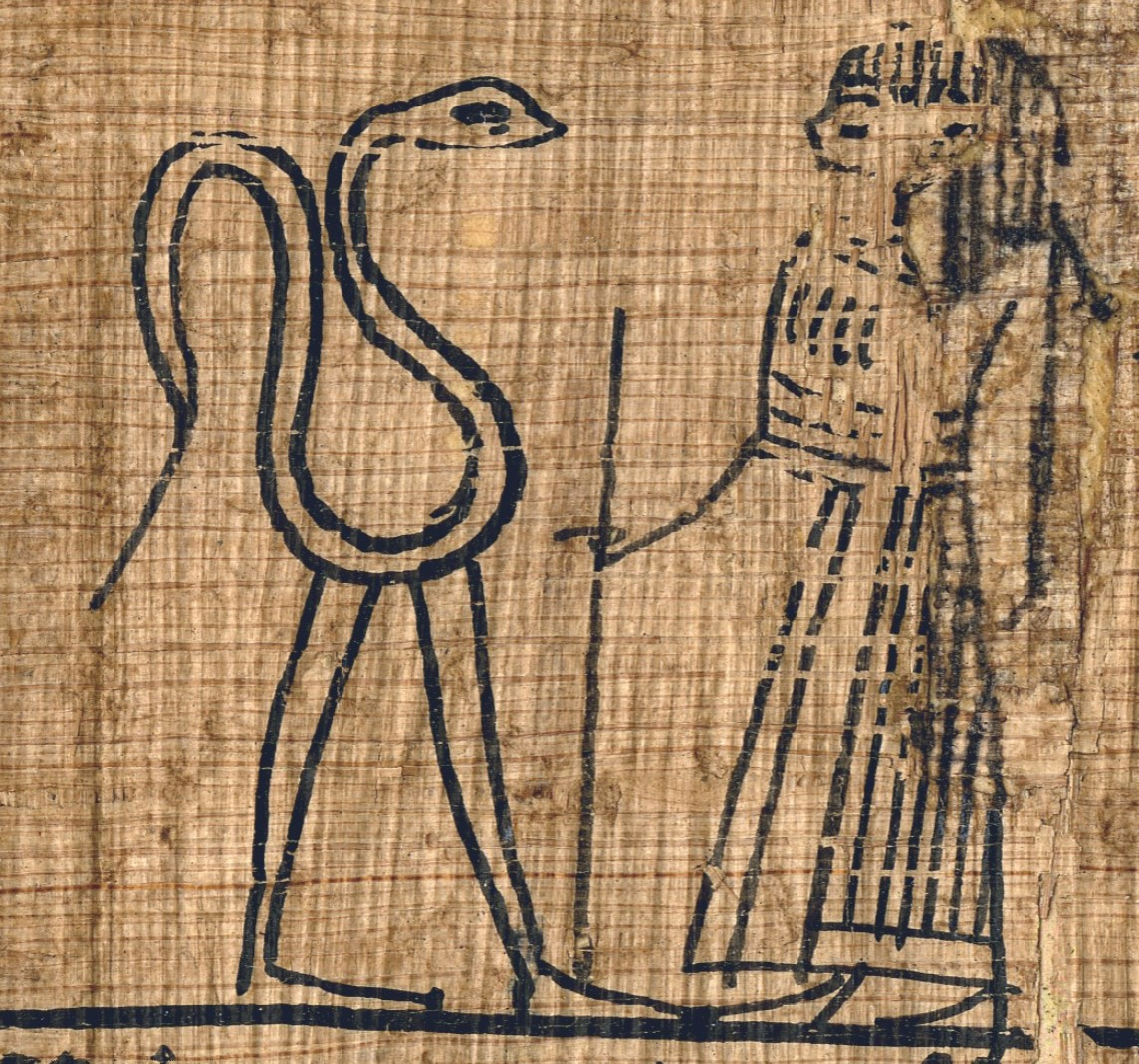
The deceased standing before a walking serpent

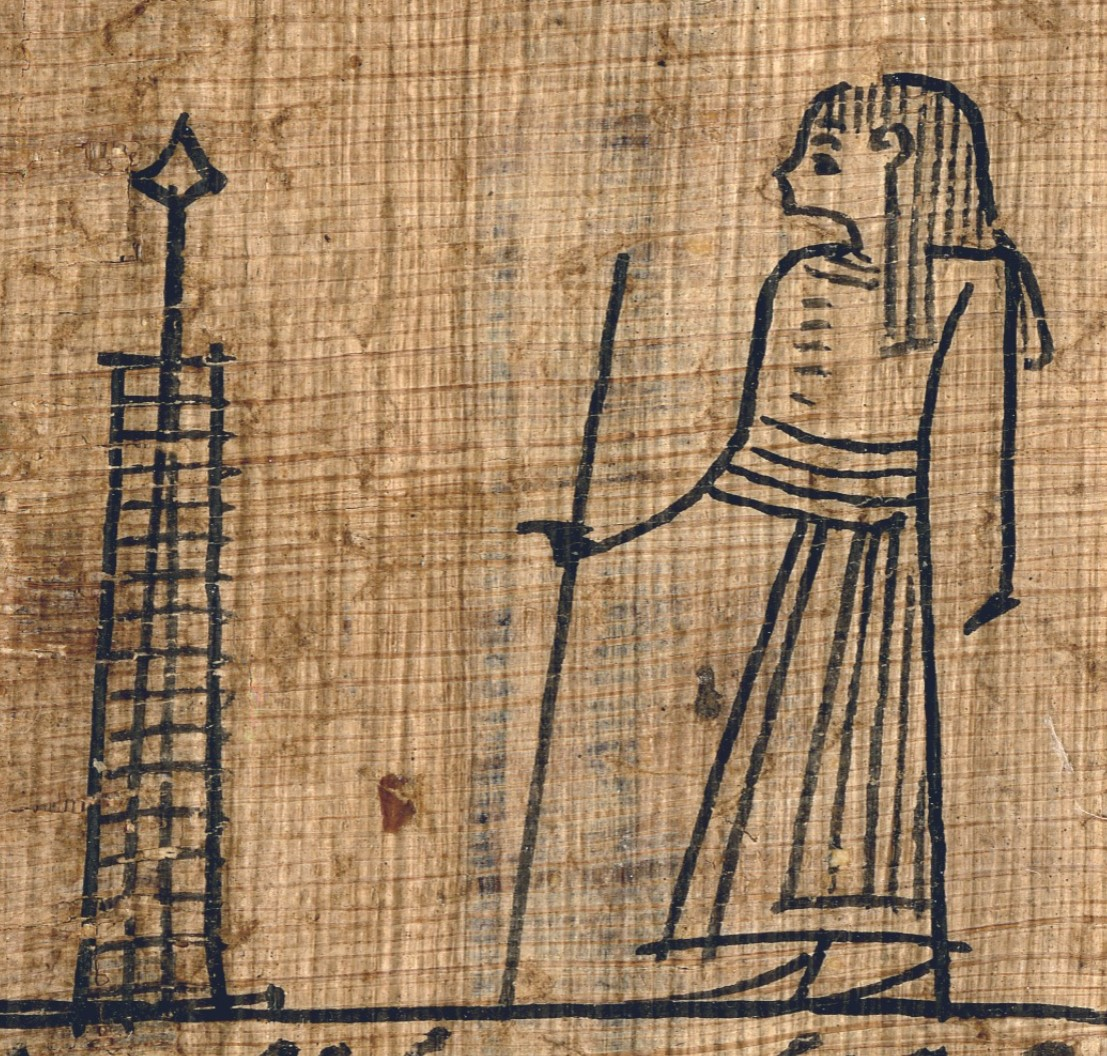
The deceased striding in front of a pillar which represents the city Heliopolis

== Book of the Dead for Nefer-ir-nebu ==
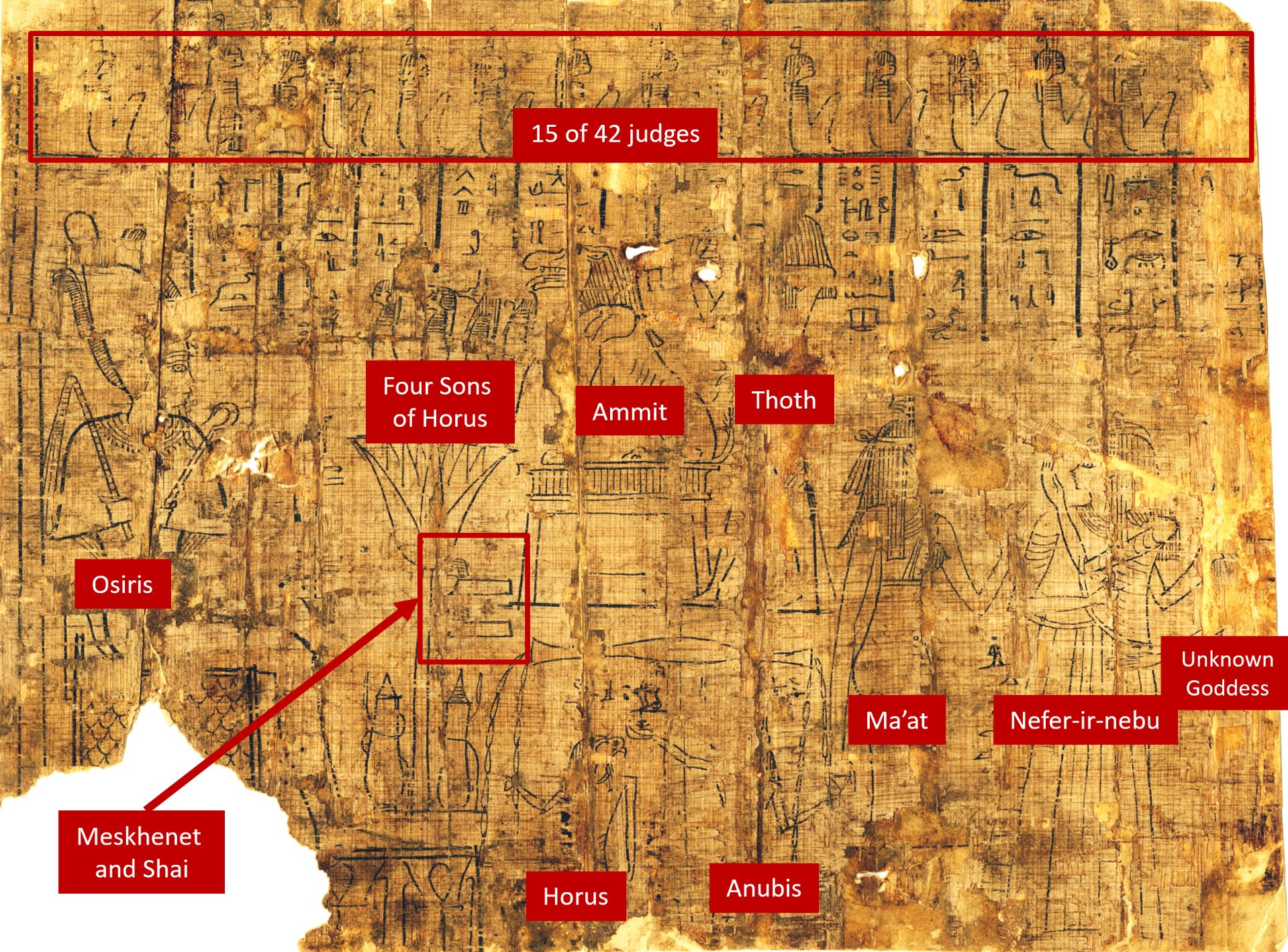

Fragments JSP IIIa-b are a vignette from "The Book of the Dead belong to the musician of Amon Re, Nefer-ir-nebu".

This vignette is a weighing of the heart judgement scene common in Egyptian funerary literature and corresponds to Book of the Dead spell 125. In the scene, Osiris sits on his throne and presides over the judgement of Nefer-ir-nebu. Prior to her judgement, Nefer-ir-nebu will go before 42 gods and goddesses and give her negative confession, proclaiming innocence to a list of 42 crimes. Her heart is on a scale, where the Gods Horus and Anubis weigh it against the feather of Ma'at, representing truth and justice. If it is neither too heavy or too light, but perfectly balanced, Nefer-ir-nebu will exist forever. If her heart is unbalanced, the beast Ammit will hungrily devour her heart and she will cease to exist.

The ibis-headed god Thoth stands by Ammit and records the judgement. In front of Osiris are the four sons of Horus (see also canopic jars from Facsimile 1 in the JSP I) standing by, protecting the internal organs of the deceased during the judgement. Halfway down the Lilly stand, above two plant shaped wine jars are two human-headed birth bricks called Meskhenet and Shai, gods of destiny that represent the fate of Nefer-ir-nebu.

=== Description by Oliver Cowdery ===
In an 1835 letter Oliver Cowdery appeared to reference this scene while describing the scroll of Joseph:

The inner end of the same roll, (Joseph's record,) presents a representation of the judgement: At one view you behold the Savior seated upon his throne, crowned, and holding the sceptres of righteousness and power, before whom also, are assembled the twelve tribes of Israel, the nations, languages and tongues of the earth, the kingdoms of the world over which satan is represented as reigning, Michael the archangel, holding the key of the bottomless pit, and at the same time the devil as being chained and shut up in the bottomless pit.

As this papyrus fragment came from a different scroll than that associated with the Book of Joseph (Book of the Dead for Ta-Sherit-Min), and the judgement scene is very common, it is possible that he was describing a similar, no longer existing version of the same scene from the Ta-Sherit-Min scroll. It is also possible that Cowdery conflated the two in his mind, thinking that the Nefer-ir-nebu vignette actually came from the Ta-Sherit-Min scroll.

== Book of the Dead for Amenhotep ==
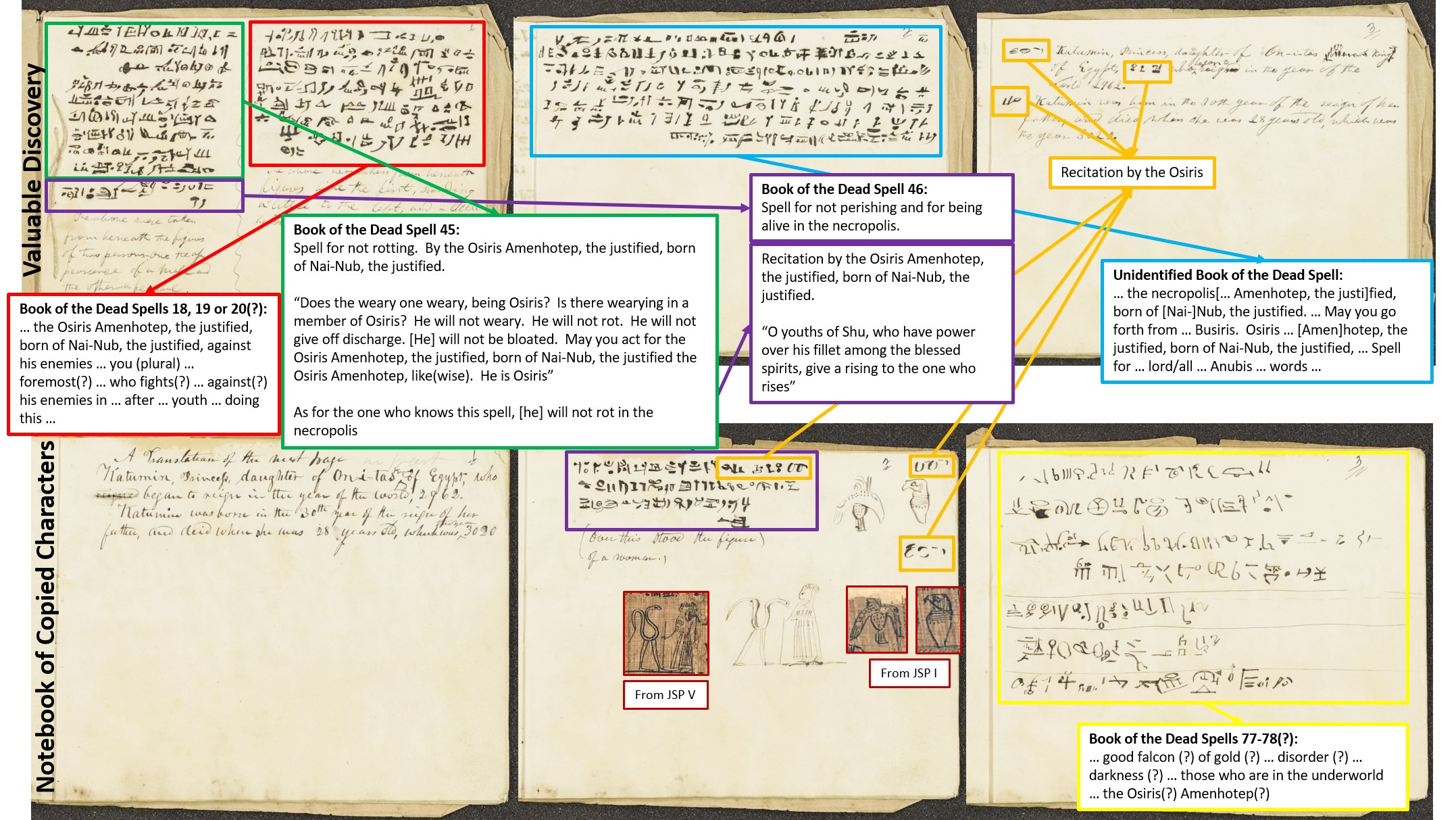
Translation of characters from two separate notebooks.

This papyrus is no longer extant. We only know of the existence because characters were copied into two notebooks known as the "Valuable Discovery Notebook" and the "Notebook of Copied Characters." Parts were translated by Smith as a short history of a Princess Katumin, daughter of Pharaoh Onitas. Several Egyptian characters from this section were written down inverted for an unknown reason, and appear as a mirror image.

Modern Egyptologists recognize it as a portion of the Book of the Dead for a man called Amenhotep. Unlike many other Egyptian funerary texts, there is no consistent or standard Book of the Dead, and Egyptians would pick and choose which spells (or chapters) they wanted in their scroll to assist them in the afterlife. As such it is impossible to know how large this Book of the Dead was.

It has been suggested that Amenhotep is a female mummy located at the Niagara Falls Museum. However, this is unlikely as the gender of Amenhotep in the Joseph Smith Papyri is male.

== Hypocephalus of Sheshonq (Facsimile #2) ==
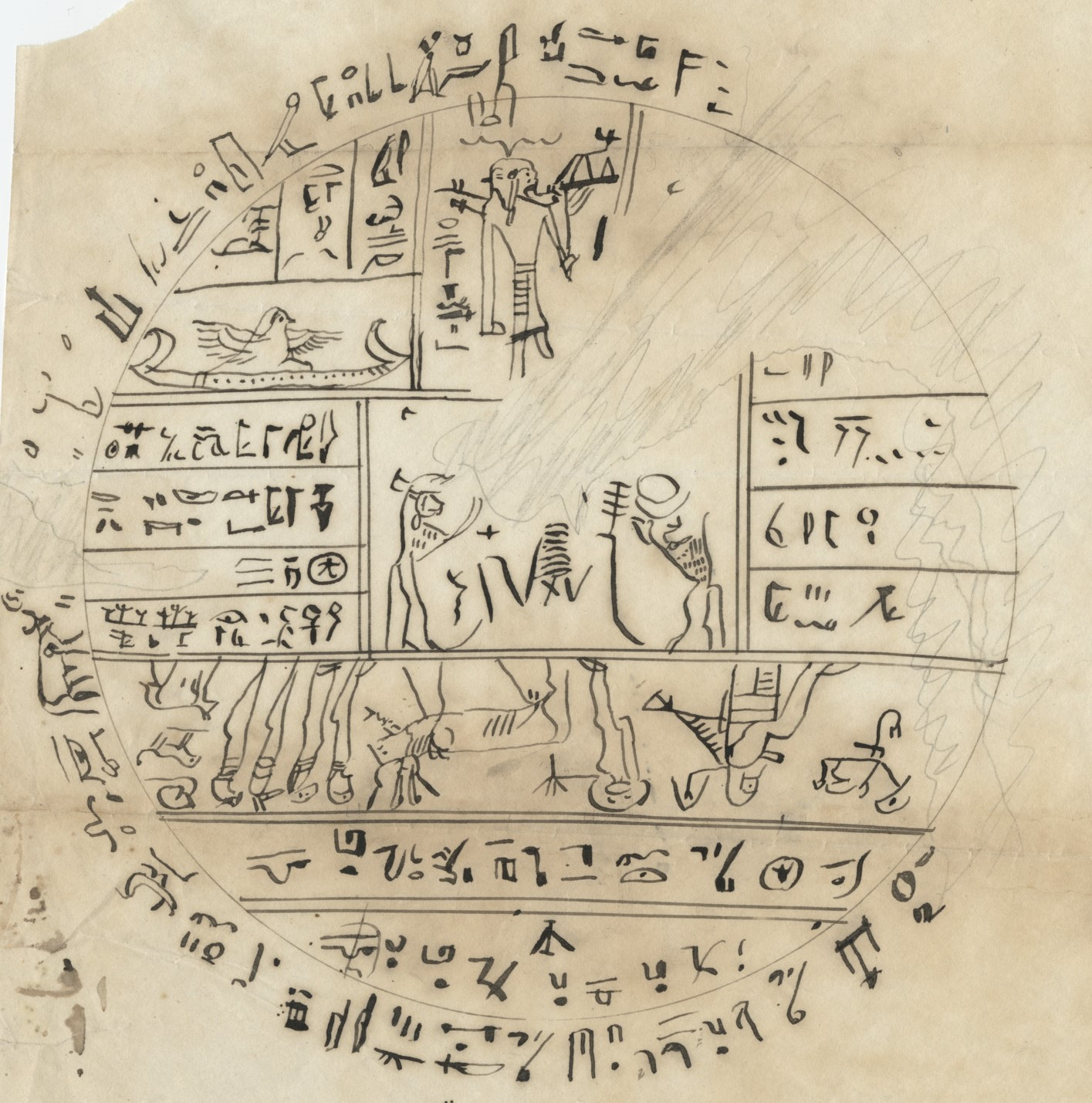
A copy of the Hypocephalus of Sheshonq, from the Kirtland Egyptian Papers

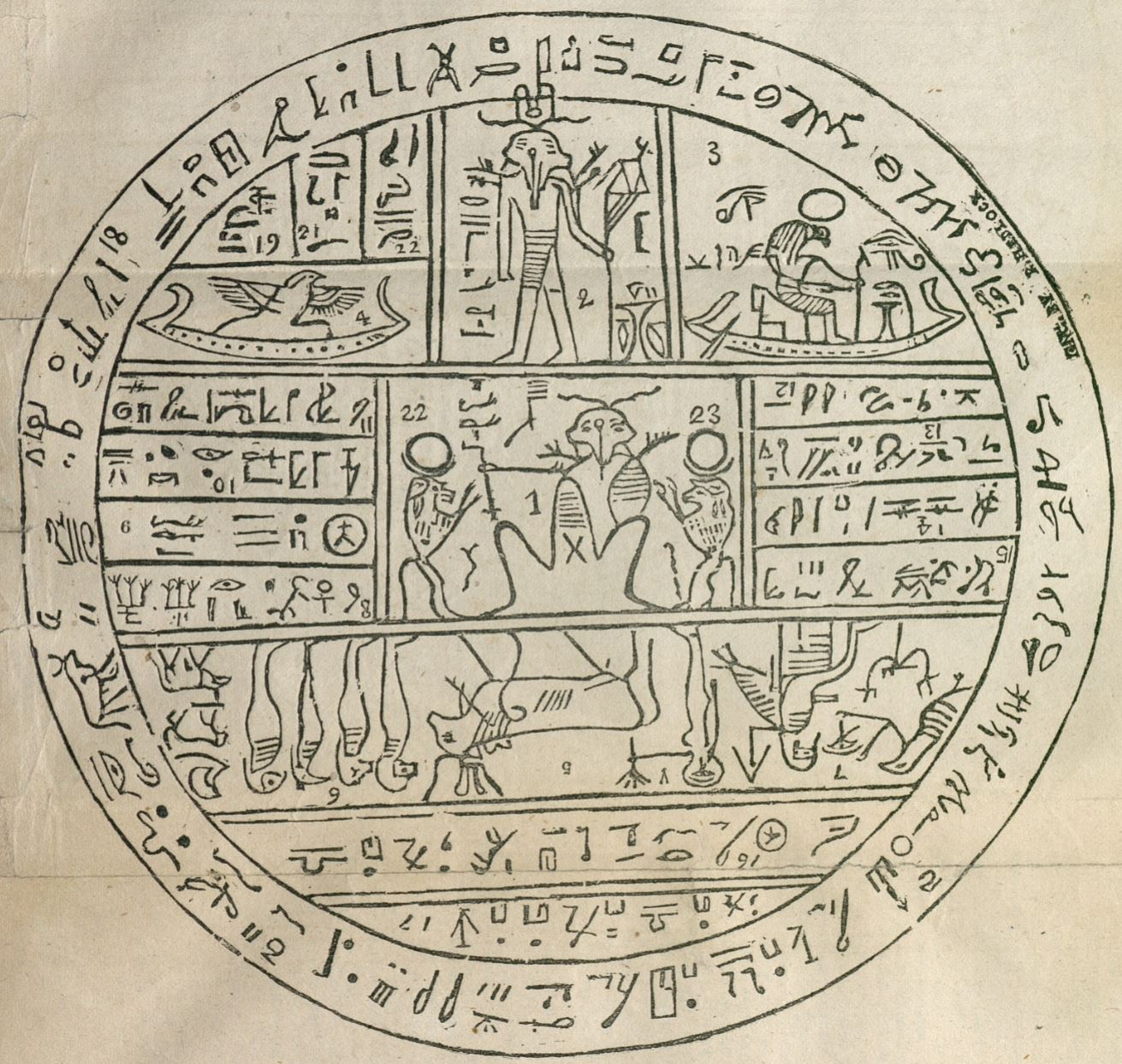
Facsimile No. 2 from the 1842 Times and Seasons, with the missing sections (lacunae) incorrectly filled in under the direction of Joseph Smith

Also known as facsimile #2 from the Book of Abraham, this no longer extant hypocephalus belonged to a person named Sheshonq. Hypocephali were disk shaped writings placed under the heads of their dead. The circle was believed to magically protect the deceased and cause the head and body to be enveloped in light and warmth, making the deceased divine. It replaced the earlier cow-amulet. Hypocephali symbolized the Eye of Ra (Eye of Horus), which represents the sun deity.

Hypocephali first appeared during the Egyptian Saite Dynasty (663–525 BC) and their use continued for centuries. Chapter 162 of the Book of the Dead version of that period contain directions for the making and use of hypocephali. No two hypocephali are the same, and there are just over 100 known samples of them.

The scenes portrayed on them relate to Egyptian ideas of resurrection and life after death, connecting them with the Osirian myth. To the ancient Egyptians the daily setting and rising of the sun was a symbol of death and rebirth. The hypocephalus represented all that the sun encircles: the world of the living, over which it passed during the day, was depicted in the upper half, and that of the dead, which it crossed during the night, in the lower portion, where the images are upside down.

== See also ==
- Book of Abraham Egyptian mummies
- Critical appraisal of the Book of Abraham
- Joseph Smith Hypocephalus
- Kirtland Egyptian Papers
- Kolob
