= Eyewitness accounts associated with the Joseph Smith Papyri =

Eyewitness accounts associated with the Joseph Smith Papyri have been analyzed extensively to understanding the content, purpose and meaning of the Book of Abraham, a canonized text of the Latter Day Saint movement. In 1835, Joseph Smith, founder of the Latter Day Saint movement, came into possession of four mummies, two papyrus rolls, and various papyrus fragments, which Smith said contained the writings of the ancient biblical patriarchs Abraham and Joseph.

The papyrus and mummies were presumed burned in the Great Chicago Fire of 1871, but fragments of the papyri were rediscovered in 1967. There are several dozen known eyewitness accounts from before the fire, which have become essential to understanding how much was lost, and which papyri the Book of Abraham came from. The intent and meaning of each eyewitness have been highly scrutinized, and in some cases vigorously debated.

== Eyewitness Accounts Prior to Joseph Smith's Possession ==
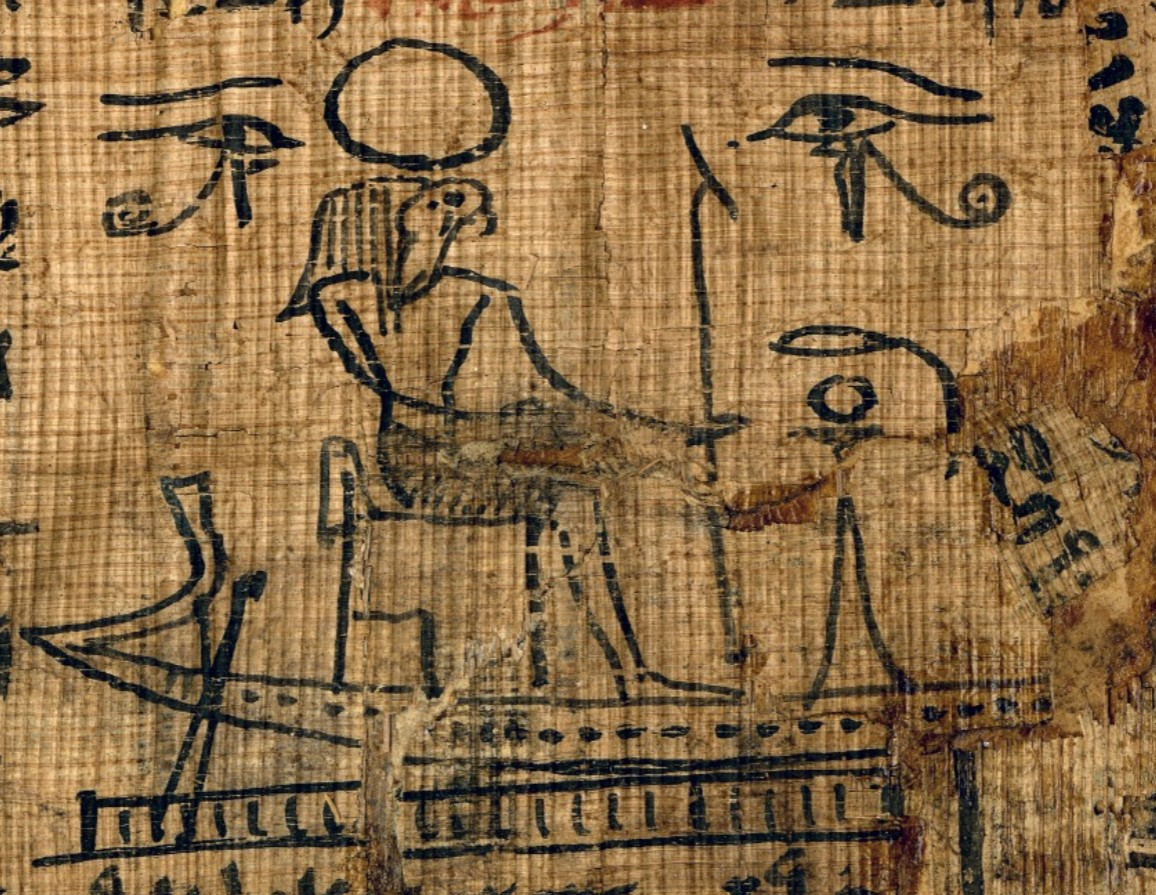
Vignette from Joseph Smith Papyri

Date	Author	Source Document	Notes
April 1833	W. E. Horner M.D.	Reproduced in Times and Seasons; 2 May 1842	
Having examined with considerable attention and deep interest, a number of Mummies from the catacombs, near Thebes, in Egypt, and now exhibited in the Arcade, we beg leave to recommend them to the observation of the curious inquirer on subjects of a period so long elapsed; probably not less than three thousand year ago. The features of some of these Mummies are in perfect expression.— The papyrus, covered with black or red ink, or paint, in excellent preservation, are very interesting. The undersigned, unsolicited by any person connected by interest with this exhibition, have voluntarily set their names hereunto, for the simple purpose of calling the attention of the public to an interesting collection, not sufficiently known in this city. JOHN REDMAN COXE, M. D. RICHARD HARLAN, M. D. J. PANCOAST, M. D. WILLIAM P. C. BARTON, M. D. E. F. RIVINUS, M. D. SAMUEL G. MORGAN, M. D. I concur in the above sentiments, concerning the collection of Mummies in the Philadelphia Arcade, and consider them highly deserving the attention of the curious. W. E. HORNER, M. D.
The last signatory, Samuel G. Morgan, was almost certainly listed incorrectly, and should have been Samuel George Morton. This unsolicited certificate of authenticity was given by leading doctors of Philadelphia to Michael Chandler. Chandler made a placard of this certificate and would display this along with the mummies and papyri, including at Kirtland.
06 Jul 1835	Michael Chandler	Certificate	Given prior to the sale of the mummies and papyri to Joseph Smith
"This is to make known to all who may be desirous, concerning the knowledge of Mr. Joseph Smith, jr, in deciphering the ancient Egyptian hierogliphic <sic> characters, in my possession, which I have, in many eminent cities, shown to the most learned: And, from the information that I could ever learn, or meet with, I find that of Mr. Joseph Smith, jr. to correspond in the most minute matters."

== Eyewitness Accounts in the Kirtland Era 1835–1838 ==
Date	Author	Source Document	Notes on Source
sometime in 1836	Sarah Studevant Leavitt	History produced from an autobiography in 1919	
We stayed at Kirtland about a week and had the privilege of hearing Joseph preach in that thing the Baptist said they called a meetinghouse [temple], which proved to be a very good house. We went into the upper rooms, saw the Egyptian mummies, the writing that was said to be written in Abraham's day, Jacob's ladder being pictured on it, and lots more wonders that I cannot write here, and that were explained to us.
On the extant papyri, there is nothing that resembles a ladder, nor is any story of Jacob in the published Book of Abraham, indicating content on the destroyed papyri.
Date of event: 6 Dec 1837; Date recorded: ca. 1936	Luman Andros Shurtliff	Biography	Biography compiled by an unknown editor from journals around 1936, written in first person.
"We examined the mummies, five in number, looked at the parchment or papyrus, as called in Egyptian language. The parchment appeared to be made of fine linen cloth, starched or sized with some kind of gum, then ironed smooth and written in charter, figures, hieroglyphics, and conveying the Egyptian language. These sheets were about eight by 12 inches. They were rolled, put in a gum case and laid on the breast of the leading men of the Egyptians. When the mummies were found, this record was on his breast. Their bodies seemed to be wound up each limb by itself, with several thicknesses of very fine cloth dipped in gum or pitch like thick tar or rosin and wound on when warm. It was from this record that the Pearl of Great Price was translated by the Prophet."
Shurtliff was incorrect about the number of mummies (there were four). This quote provides evidence that the papyri were cut up and pasted onto sheets of paper by late 1837. Dan Vogel feels the quote is too ambiguous to draw conclusions, but that if Shurtliff really was referring to the cut up sheets, this would be evidence that the Book of Abraham was translated from some of the cut up sheets, and not the remaining roll of papyrus.

== Eyewitness Accounts in the Missouri Era 1838–1839 ==
Date	Author	Source Document	Notes
1838-1839	Henry Tressler	Deseret Weekly News letter to the editor	As recorded by Foster W. Jones, who interviewed Tressler in 1897, when he was 86 years old.
"We had a most successful trip, during which time we met Mr. Henry Tressler of Brownstown, Johnson county, Indiana, one of the guards who had charge of the Prophet Joseph Smith at Far West, Caldwell county, Mo., from which place he was taken to Liberty, Clay county, Mo. ... He was also the steward during the imprisonment at Liberty, at which time he had many conversations with the Prophet Joseph, who presented him with a Book of Mormon, which is highly prized by him. He also saw the rolls of Papyrus from which the Pearl of Great Price was translated, and procured a piece of the bandage that was wrapped around one of the mummies exhibited by Mr. Chandler."
Prior to September 1838	Anson Call	Autobiography of Anson Call, as recorded in a Master's Thesis	A recollection years later.
"While at Far West I happened in John Corl's or the church store and my attention was called by Vincent Knights who was opening some boxes of goods. Says he, 'Joseph will be much pleased with these.['] He had been very uneasy about the translation of the Bible and the Egyptian Records. here they are, placing them on the table. Said he to me, 'If you will take one of these, I will the other and we will carry them over to Joseph's office.' There we found Joseph and six or seven other brethren. Joseph was much pleased with the arrival of the books and said to us 'Sit down and we will read to you from the translations of the book of Abraham.' Oliver Cowdery then read until he was tired when Thomas Marsh read making altogether about two hours. I was much interested in the work."
Oliver Cowdery was not in good standing at this time and would not have been present at this gathering, indicating that Anson Call remembered the episode incorrectly. This quote has been used to indicate that the Book of Abraham was much longer than what we currently have, suggesting that the Book of Abraham translation had reached a farther point than previously thought. The editors of The Joseph Smith Papers gave the following possibilities for the length of time it took to read the manuscript: They read additional Book of Abraham material that is no longer extant.; A lengthy conversation took place along with the reading.; Call did not know or failed to state that they were reading from multiple records. (the recollection also mentions the "translation of the Bible")
Date of reminiscence: Winter of 1838–1839; Recorded in 1882	Henry Asbury, a resident of Quincy, Illinois	Memoir	
"During the winter of 1837-8, a large number of the Mormon people upon their expulsion from Missouri arrived at Quincy.... The winter passed in quietness and the Mormons were on their good behavior. Old Daddy Smith and his aged wife, Joe Smith's father and mother, rented the house or part of it, situated on the northeast corner of Sixth and Hampshire Streets, and set up a sort of museum of curiosities, consisting mainly of several mummies from Egypt. The old lady charged ten cents admittance and acted as exhibitor, explaining who and what each object really was. I am now unable to accurately give the substance of these explanations by the old lady, but in substance they amounted to an assertion that one or more of the mummies was one of the Pharaohs or kings of Egypt, and there belonged to him some hieroglyphics or writings upon papyrus, which she said in some way proved the truth of Mormonism or something tending in that direction. The show did not seem to pay and did not run long here. However uncanonical and doubtful Joe Smith's revelations might have appeared to others, his old father and mother no doubt believed them all."
This is the only known evidence that the mummies and papyri were in Quincy, Illinois The year the Mormons were expelled was remembered incorrectly, the events occurred in 1838–1839, not 1837–1838.

== Eyewitness Accounts in the Nauvoo Era 1839–1844 ==
Date	Author	Source Document	Notes
Date of Event: 5 May 1841; Date Recorded: 1848	Williams Ivan Appleby	Journal	
Today I paid Bro. Joseph a visit.... Viewed four mummies, one male and three females, brought from Ancient Thebes in Egypt, saw the Rolls of Papyrus, and the writing thereon, taken from off the bosom of the Male Mummy, being some of the writings of ancient Abraham and of Joseph, that was sold into Egypt. The writings are chiefly in the Egyptian language, with the exception of a little Hebrew I believe. They give a description of some of the scenes in Ancient Egypt, of their worship, their Idol Gods, etc. The writings are beautiful and plain; composed of red, and black ink. There is a perceptible difference between the writings. Joseph appears to have been the best scribe. There are also representations of men, beasts, Birds, Idols, and oxen attached to a kind of a Plough, and a female guiding it. Also the serpent when he beguiled Eve. He appears with two legs, erect in the form and appearance of man. But his head in the form and representing the Serpent with his forked tongue extended. There are likewise representations of an Altar erected, with a man bound and laid thereon, and a Priest with a knife in his hand, standing at the foot, with a dove over the person bound on the Altar with several Idol gods standing around it. A Celestial globe, with the planet Kolob or first creation of the supreme Being —a planet of light, which planet—makes a revolution once in a thousand years,—Also the Lord revealing the Grand key words of the Holy Priesthood, to Adam in the garden of Eden, as also to Seth, Noah, Melchizedek, Abraham, and to all whom the Priesthood was revealed. -Abraham also in the Court of Pharaoh sitting upon the King's throne reasoning upon Astronomy, with a crown upon his head, representing the Priesthood as emblematical of the grand Presidency in Heaven, with the scepter of Justice and Judgment in his hand. And King Pharaoh, standing behind him, together with a Prince—a principal waiter, and a black slave of the King. A Genealogy of the Mummies, and Epitaphs on their deaths etc. etc., are all distinctly represented on the Papyrus. Which is called the "Book of Abraham" The male mummy was one of the ancient -Pharaoh's of Egypt, and a priest, as he is embalmed with his tongue extended, representing a speaker. The female were his wife and two daughters, as a part of the writing has been translated, and informs us who they were, also where writings it is, and when those mummies were embalmed, which is nearly four thousand years ago. There is also a vivid description given on the Papyrus, of the creation, far more as accurately and minutely, than the account given in the Bible. Likewise where the Idolatrous Priest "Elkenah" attempted to offer up Abraham as a sacrifice to their Idol gods, in Egypt (as represented by the Altar etc. before referred to). But was delivered by the interposition of Almighty power, representing the Dove over the Altar, where Abraham lies Bound, which broke the cords by which he was bound, tore down the Altar, and killed the Priest.
19 Feb 1843	Charlotte Haven	Letter	Published first in 1890.
From there we called on Joseph's mother, ... Madame Smith's residence is a log house very near her son's. She opened the door and received us cordially. She is a motherly kind of woman of about sixty years. She receives a little pittance by exhibiting The Mummies to strangers. When we asked to see them, she lit a candle and conducted us up a short, narrow stairway to a low, dark room under the roof. On one side were standing half a dozen mummies, to one she introduced us, King Onitus and his royal household, -one she did not know. Then she took up what seemed to be a club and wrapped in a dark cloth, and said "This is the leg of Pharaoh's daughter, the one that saved Moses." Repressing a smile, I looked from the mummies to the old lady, but could detect nothing but earnestness and sincerity on her countenance. Then she turned to a long table, set her candle-stick down, and opened a long roll of manuscript, saying it was "the writing of Abraham and Isaac, written in Hebrew and Sanscrit," and she read several minutes from it as if it were English. It sounded very much like passages from the Old Testament-and it might have been for anything we knew-but she said she read it through the inspiration of her son Joseph, in whom she seemed to have perfect confidence. Then she interpreted to us hieroglyphics from another roll. One was Mother Eve being tempted by a serpent, who-the serpent I mean-was standing on the tip of his tail, which with his two legs formed a tripod, and had his head in Eve's ear. I said, "But serpents don't have legs." "They did before the fall," she asserted with perfect confidence. The judge slipped a coin in her hand which she received smilingly, with a pleasant, "Come again," as we bade her goodby.
25 Apr 1844	Josiah Quincy Jr.	Book	Published first in 1883.
"And now come with me," said the prophet, "and I will show you the curiosities." So saying, he led the way to a lower room, where sat a venerable and respectable-looking lady. "This is my mother, gentlemen. The curiosities we shall see belong to her. They were purchased with her own money, at a cost of six thousand dollars;" and then with deep feeling, were added the words, "And that woman was turned out upon the prairie in the dead of night by a mob." There were some pine presses fixed against the wall of the room. These receptacles Smith opened and disclosed four human bodies, shrunken and black with age. "These are mummies," said the exhibitor. "I want you to look at that little runt of a fellow over there. He was a great man in his day. Why, that was Pharaoh Necho, King of Egypt!" Some parchments inscribed with hieroglyphics were then offered us. They were preserved under glass and handled with great respect. "That is the handwriting of Abraham, the Father of the Faithful," said the prophet. "This is the autograph of Moses, and these lines were written by his brother Aaron. Here we have the earliest account of the Creation, from which Moses composed the First Book of Genesis." The parchment last referred to showed a rude drawing of a man and woman, and a serpent walking upon a pair of legs. I ventured to doubt the propriety of providing the reptile in question with this unusual means of locomotion. "Why, that's as plain as a pikestaff," was the rejoinder. "Before the Fall snakes always went about on legs, just like chickens. They were deprived of them, in punishment for their agency in the ruin of man." We were further assured that the prophet was the only mortal who could translate these mysterious writings, and that his power was given by direct inspiration. ... "Gentlemen," said the bourgeois Mohammed, as he closed the cabinets, "those who see these curiosities generally pay my mother a quarter of a dollar.
Date of event: Between November 1843 and June 1844	Benjamin Ashby (1828-1907)	Autobiography	Recollected decades after the event
One day with my mother I visited his house, he was not in but we spent an interesting time with his mother. She exhibited the mummies from which the Book of Abraham was taken as well as the original papyrus on which it was written.
Ashby was a 15 years old convert and recent arrival to Nauvoo to at the time he viewed the mummies and papyri. Egyptologist Kerry Muhlestein sees this quote as possible evidence that Book of Abraham was taken from a long roll, "It is not fully clear but it appears that his reference to “the original papyrus” refers to the long roll as the source."

== Eyewitness Accounts After the Death of Joseph Smith 1844–1871 ==
Date	Author	Source Document	Notes
September 1846	unknown	Letter, republished anonymously as "M" in a Quaker magazine	
After we had obtained all the information we could at the Temple, we visited the Mother of the Prophet, (a respectable looking old lady) who has four Mummies for exhibition, who (she says) were a King and Queen, and their Son and Daughter, and gives the names of each. She produced a black looking roll (which she told us was papyrus) found upon the breast of the King, part of which the Prophet had unrolled and read; and she had pasted the deciphered sheets on the leaves of a book which she showed us. The roll was as dark as the bones of the Mummies, and bore very much the same appearance; but the opened sheets were exceedingly like thin parchment, and of quite a light color. There were birds, fishes, and fantastic looking people, interspersed amidst hyeroglyphics; but the old lady explained the meaning of them all, as Joseph had interpreted them to her. The stories appeared to be more particular accounts than our Bible gives us, of Noah, the Ark and the flood—of Abraham and Melchizedec—of Joseph and Pharaoh—and of various other distinguished characters. She said, that when Joseph was reading the papyrus, he closed his eyes, and held a hat over his face, and that the revelation came to him; and that where the papyrus was torn, he could read the parts that were destroyed equally as well as those that were there; and that scribes sat by him writing, as he expounded. She showed us a large book where these things were printed, which of course sealed their truth to Mormon eyes and minds; but we had not time to read them.
This quote demonstrates an ongoing confusion over the gender of the mummies, where two male and two female are referenced here. There are no fish on the surviving fragments of papyri, further evidence of sections that are no longer extant. Egyptologist John Gee argues that phrase "the pasted deciphered sheets on the leaves of a book" refers to a copy of Joseph Smith's translation, not the original fragments of papyri.
Recollection from between 1852 and 1856	Jerusha Walker Blanchard, Granddaughter of Hyrum Smith	1922 Relief Society Magazine	Recalled in a 1922 interview
What fun we had with Aunt Emma's boys, Joseph, Frederick, Alexander and David. How we raced through the house playing hide and seek. My favorite hiding place was in an old wardrobe which contained the mummies, and it was in here that I would creep while the others searched the house. There were three mummies: The old Egyptian king, the queen and their daughter. The bodies were wrapped in seven layers of linen cut in thin strips. In the arms of the Old King, lay the roll of papyrus from which our prophet translated the Book of Abraham.
Used as second-hand evidence that the Book of Abraham was written from a scroll, not the pasted fragments of papyri.

== Joseph Smith Journal Entries ==
Date	Location	Notes
1 Oct 1835	Kirtland, Ohio	Originally found in 1835–1836 Journal, reproduced in other places with slight variants, including the History 1838–1856
This after noon labored on the Egyptian alphabet, in company with brsr O[liver] Cowdery and W[illiam] W. Phelps: The system of astronomy was unfolded.
There are entries on astronomy in three Egyptian Alphabet Documents (including one in Joseph Smith's handwriting), and in the Grammar and Alphabet of the Egyptian Language that could be what is mentioned as a "system of Astronomy". The "system of astronomy" has been pointed to by apologists as evidence that the Book of Abraham chapter 3 had been translated before the Grammar and Alphabet of the Egyptian Language was produced, which is important for establishing the theory that the Kirtland Egyptian Papers were a reverse translation of the Book of Abraham.
1 Oct 1835	Kirtland, Ohio	Originally found in 1835–1836 Journal
this afternoon recommenced translating the ancient records.
19 Nov 1835	Kirtland, Ohio	Originally found in 1835–1836 Journal
I returned home and spent the day in translating the Egyptian records
20 Nov 1835	Kirtland, Ohio	Originally found in 1835–1836 Journal
... we spent the day in translating, and made rapid progress
24 Nov 1835	Kirtland, Ohio	Originally found in 1835–1836 Journal
... in the after-noon, we translated some of the Egyptian, records;
25 Nov 1835	Kirtland, Ohio	Originally found in 1835–1836 Journal
Wednesday 25th spent the day in Translating.
This is the last entry that mentions translating until March 1842. Based on textual evidence it is believed that Abraham 1:1 through Abraham 2:18 was translated at this point.
26 Nov 1835	Kirtland, Ohio	Originally found in 1835–1836 Journal
Thursday 26th at home, we spent the day in transcribing Egyptian characters from the papyrus.
The History of the Church repeats this entry but instead uses the term "translation" instead of "transcribing". There are several transcriptions of Egyptian characters that this could refer to in the Kirtland Egyptian Papers.
8 Mar 1842	Nauvoo, Illinois	
Commenced Translating from the Book of Abraham, for the 10 No of the Times and seasons
9 Mar 1842	Nauvoo, Illinois	
Examining copy for the Times & Seasons presented by. [John] Taylor & Bennet [John C. Bennett].— and a variety of other business in this the Presidents office in the morning. in the afternoon continu[e]d the Translation of the Book of Abraham. called Bishop Nnights [Vinson Knight] & Mr the Post office <Mr [Amos] Davis's> &c with the Re[c]order. & continued translating & revising. & Reading letters in the evening Sister Emma being present in the office
This is the last entry that mentions translation.
