= John Varden =

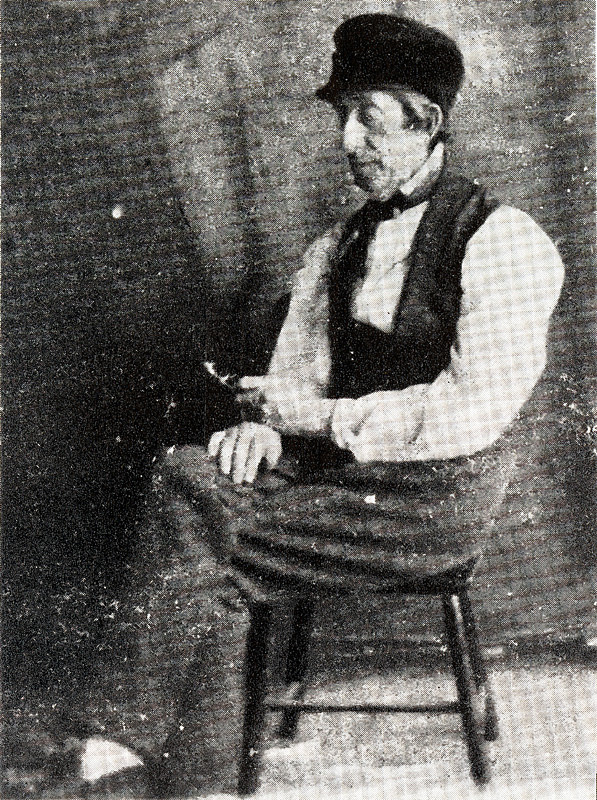
John Varden

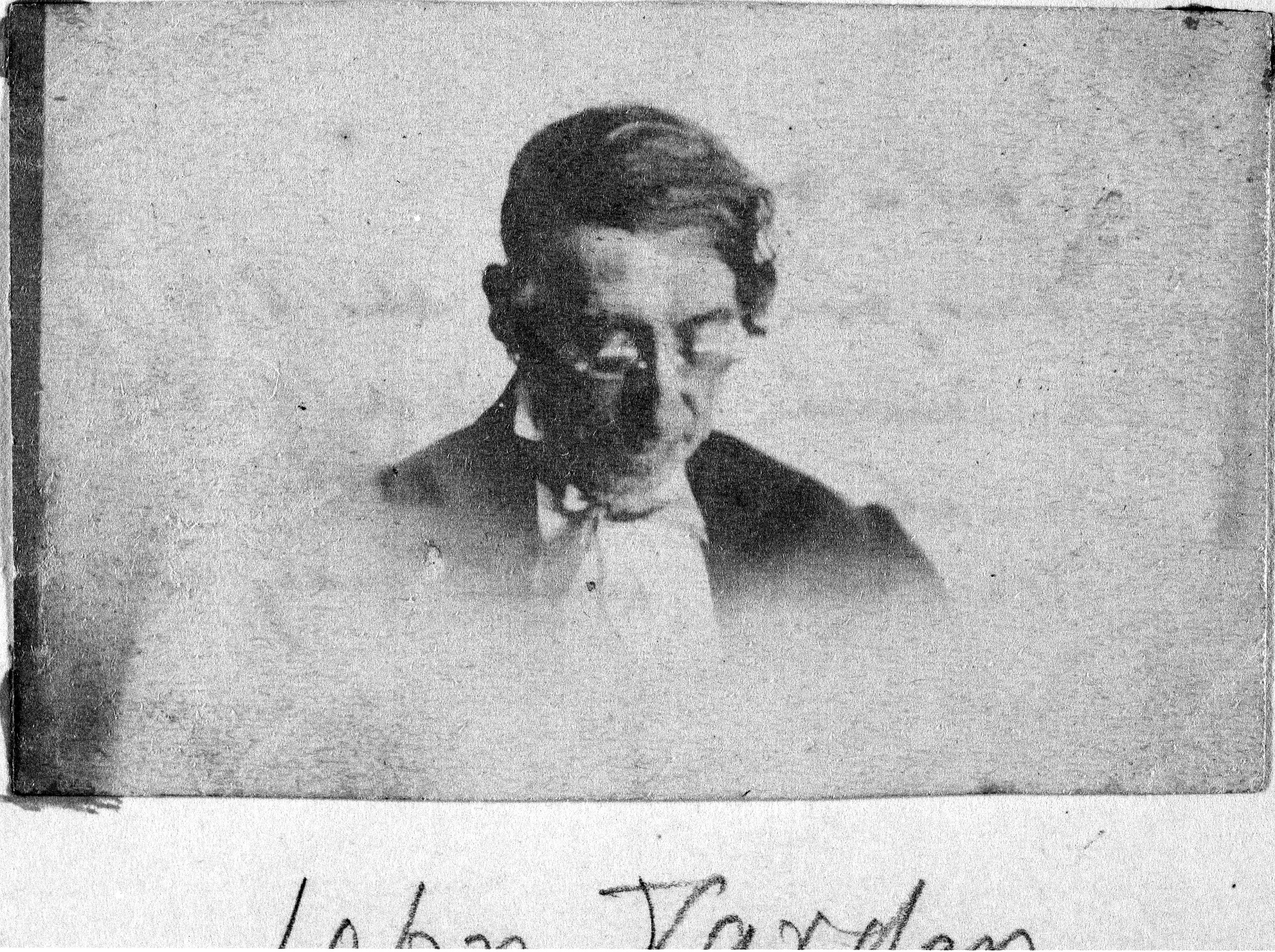
John Varden in around 1860

John Varden (c. 1790–1865) was an American collector of antiquities and museum pieces in the Washington D.C. area. He opened a commercial museum called the "Washington Museum of Curiosities" but was forced out of business by the free National Institute which started in 1840. He sold his collection to the National Institute, where he became an assistant curator. He worked at the Smithsonian from 1858 until his death in 1865.

His collections formed the core of the Smithsonian's museum.
