= Robert K. Ritner =

American Egyptologist (1953–2021)

Dr. Robert K. Ritner
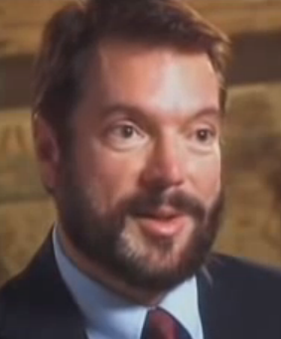
- Born: April 5, 1953; Houston, Texas, United States
- Died: July 25, 2021 (aged 68); Chicago, Illinois, United States
- Education: Rice University; University of Chicago
- Occupation: Professor of Egyptology
- Employer(s): University of Chicago, Oriental Institute
- Known for: Egyptology, Critiquing the Book of Abraham

Robert Kriech Ritner (April 5, 1953 – July 25, 2021) was an American Egyptologist most recently at the Oriental Institute of the University of Chicago.

== Life ==
=== Education ===
Ritner received his BA in psychology from Rice University in 1975, and his Ph.D. (with honors) in Egyptology from the University of Chicago in 1987. His doctoral dissertation, The Mechanics of Ancient Egyptian Magical Practice, was supervised by Edward F. Wente.

=== Teaching ===
Between 1991 and 1996, Ritner held the position of Marilyn M. Simpson Assistant Professor of Egyptology in the Department of Near Eastern Languages and Civilizations at Yale University. In 1996, he was recruited to the University of Chicago's Oriental Institute and Department of Near Eastern Languages and Civilizations.

=== Field of work ===
Ritner was widely known for his work on Egyptian religious practices, language, medicine, literature, magic, and political history. Within the Mormon studies community, Ritner was known for confirming the conclusions of other Egyptologists who have investigated the Joseph Smith papyri. Ritner concluded that the Book of Abraham is "a perhaps well-meaning, but erroneous invention by Joseph Smith."

He was a descendant of Joseph Ritner, who served as the Anti-Masonic Governor of Pennsylvania from 1835 to 1839, which Professor Ritner noted, with some amusement as in his own opinion Freemasonry ought to be credited with popularizing ancient Egyptian culture and architecture.

== Death ==
Ritner died on 25 July 2021, at the age of 68.

== Works ==
Books

- Ritner, Robert K. (1993), The Mechanics of Ancient Egyptian Magical Practice (PDF), Chicago: Oriental Institute of University of Chicago, ISBN 0918986753, OCLC 28176694, archived from the original on 2023-05-06
- Simpson, William Kelly; Ritner, Robert K. (2003) [1973], The literature of ancient Egypt: an anthology of stories, instructions, stelae, autobiographies, and poetry (3rd ed.), New Haven, Connecticut: Yale University Press, ISBN 9780300128567, OCLC 234083884
- Nissinen, Martti; Ritner, Robert Kriech; Seow, C L; Machinist, Peter (2003), Prophets and prophecy in the ancient Near East, Atlanta: Society of Biblical Literature, ISBN 158983027X, OCLC 51969302
- Yener, K Aslihan; Batiuk, Stephen; Ritner, Robert Kriech (2005), The Amuq Valley regional projects, Chicago: Oriental Institute of the University of Chicago, ISBN 1885923325, OCLC 66385293
- Ritner, Robert K. (2009), The Libyan Anarchy: Inscriptions from Egypt's Third Intermediate Period, Writings from the ancient world, no. 21, Atlanta: Society of Biblical Literature, ISBN 9781589831742, OCLC 60671773
- —— (2013), The Joseph Smith Egyptian Papyri: A Complete Edition, Salt Lake City: Signature Books, ISBN 978-1560852209, OCLC 869043745
- Ritner, Robert K., ed. (2018). Essays for the Library of Seshat: Studies Presented to Janet H. Johnson on the Occasion of Her 70th Birthday. Chicago: Oriental Institute Press. ISBN 978-1614910329.

Chapters

- Ritner, Robert K. (1989), "Horus on the crocodiles: a juncture of religion and magic in late dynastic Egypt", in Simpson, William Kelly (ed.), Religion and philosophy in ancient Egypt, New Haven, Connecticut: Yale Egyptological Seminar, Dept. of Near Eastern Languages and Civilizations, Yale University, ISBN 0912532181, OCLC 20996843

Articles

- Ritner, Robert K. (1979), "Egyptians in Ireland: a question of Coptic peregrinations" (PDF), Rice University Studies, 62 (2), William Marsh Rice University: 65–87, OCLC 5160106
- —— (July 1984), "A Uterine Amulet in the Oriental Institute Collection", Journal of Near Eastern Studies, 43 (3): 209–221, doi:10.1086/373080, JSTOR 544461, PMID 16468192, S2CID 42701708
- —— (1985), "Anubis and the Lunar Disc", The Journal of Egyptian Archaeology, 71: 149–155, doi:10.1177/030751338507100115, JSTOR 3821720, S2CID 192228494
- Foster, Karen Polinger; Ritner, Robert K. (January 1996), "Texts, storms, and the Thera eruption", Journal of Near Eastern Studies, 55 (1): 1–14, doi:10.1086/373781, JSTOR 545376, S2CID 162024484
- Ritner, Robert K. (April 2000), "Innovations and Adaptations in Ancient Egyptian Medicine", Journal of Near Eastern Studies, 59 (2): 107–117, doi:10.1086/468799, JSTOR 545610, PMID 16468204, S2CID 39263523
- —— (2000), "The 'Breathing Permit of Hôr' Thirty-four Years Later", Dialogue, 33 (4): 97–119
- —— (2003), "'The Breathing Permit of Hôr' among the Joseph Smith Papyri", Journal of Near Eastern Studies, 62 (3): 161–77, doi:10.1086/380315, JSTOR 10.1086/380315, S2CID 162323232
- ——; Moeller, Nadine (April 2014), "The Ahmose 'Tempest Stela', Thera and Comparative Chronology PDF", Journal of Near Eastern Studies, 73 (1): 1–19, doi:10.1086/675069, JSTOR 10.1086/675069, S2CID 161410518
- Robert Rotner, Ptolemy IX (Soter II) at Thebes (Chapter 6: pp.97-114) in Perspectives on Ptolemaic Thebes, (ed: Peter F. Dorman & Betsy M. Bryan), studies in Ancient Oriental Civilization 65, The Oriental Institute of the University of Chicago, 2011 ARCHIVED COPY
- Robert Ritner & Foy D. Schalf, Anubis, Archer Figures, and Demotic Magic PDF GM 259 (2019), pp. 185–195
