= Fanny Stenhouse =

American Mormon pioneer

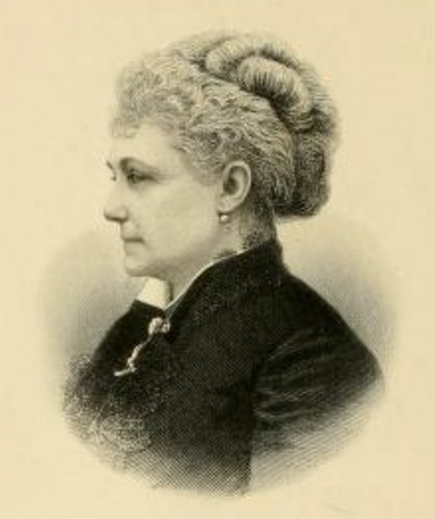
- A portrait of Stenhouse from her book Exposé of Polygamy in Utah: A Lady’s Life among the Mormons (1872)
- Born: Fanny Warn; April 12, 1829; Saint Helier, Jersey.
- Died: April 19, 1904 (aged 75); Los Angeles, California, U.S.
- Spouse: T. B. H. Stenhouse (m. 1850–1882)

Fanny Warn Stenhouse (née Warn; 12 April 1829 – 19 April 1904) was an early Mormon pioneer who was excommunicated from the Church of Jesus Christ of Latter-day Saints (LDS Church) and was most famous for her 1872 publication Exposé of Polygamy in Utah: A Lady’s Life among the Mormons, a record of personal experience as one of the wives of a Mormon elder during a period of more than twenty years in the mid-1800s.

== Early life ==
Born in Jersey, at the age of 15 she went to teach English in France for six years; upon return to the island finding her parents and siblings had joined the Mormon sect. With initial prejudices, she then joined the sect herself, and a few months later, she got married in 1850.

== Mormonism ==
After proselytising in Europe including Switzerland, she accompanied her husband to New York then onto Utah in 1859 where she remained for sixteen years. With increasing skepticism of polygamy, she also held a poor opinion of LDS Church president, Brigham Young, doubting 'his honesty very much, and is of opinion that from the first he never overlooked his own interests'; in response 'for herself she got all her family away from the place with the exception of her eldest daughter'.

In about 1870 Stenhouse and her husband became part of the "Godbeites", a dissident offshoot group, and were excommunicated from the LDS Church.

Stenhouse visited Australia by September 1875 in Melbourne to lecture about the emerging religion of Mormonism, including the ongoing discussion of polygamy. By October 1875 in Sydney, the lecture title was Mormonism exposed. February 1876 saw Stenhouse back in Melbourne at the Athenxum Hall, delivering 'a lecture exposing the evils of Mormonism'. She returned on the Pacific Mail Steamship Company's SS Australia in May 1876.

== Later life ==
Her husband T. B. H. Stenhouse was born in 1825, a native of Dalkeith, Scotland. He established the French journal La Reflecteur, and was a scientific writer in New York for the Herald. After settling in Utah, he established the first daily newspaper for Salt Lake City, the Daily Telegraph. Quite profitable, it collapsed when articles were too liberal for the sect founder, who then informed its subscribers to discontinue their patronage; whence he abandoned the church, and became a postmaster in the city and elsewhere. He died from jaundice on 8 March 1882, at 1509 Geary Street, San Francisco.

They had over two daughters and three sons.

Stenhouse's eldest daughter was the first wife of Joseph Angell Young, the eldest son of Brigham Young.
