= T. B. H. Stenhouse =

American journalist

Thomas Brown Holmes Stenhouse (21 February 1825 – 7 March 1882) was an early Mormon pioneer and missionary who later became a Godbeite and with his wife, Fanny Stenhouse, became a vocal opponent of the Church of Jesus Christ of Latter-day Saints (LDS Church).

Stenhouse was born in Dalkeith, Scotland. He joined the LDS Church in England in 1845. In 1850, Stenhouse married Fanny Warn and shortly thereafter joined Lorenzo Snow and Joseph Toronto on a mission to Italy; they became the first LDS Church missionaries to preach in that country. Later in the same year, Stenhouse was sent to Switzerland and became the first Mormon missionary to preach there.

In 1855, Stenhouse and his wife emigrated to Utah Territory. They settled in Salt Lake City; Stenhouse the editor of the Salt Lake Telegraph, a newspaper that was consistently pro-Mormon. Their daughter, Clara Federata Stenhouse, married Joseph Angell Young. In 1870, Stenhouse was convinced by the writings of William S. Godbe, who criticised LDS Church President Brigham Young on political and religious grounds. The Stenhouses were particularly opposed to the LDS Church's practice of plural marriage. Stenhouse and his wife became part of the "Godbeites" and were excommunicated from the LDS Church.

As Godbeites, Stenhouse and his wife published several exposés of Mormonism. Stenhouse's most famous work is his 1873 The Rocky Mountain Saints: A Full and Complete History of the Mormons. In 1872, Fanny Stenhouse published "Tell it All": The Story of a Life Experience in Mormonism. Stenhouse died in San Francisco, California.
