= The Rocky Mountain Saints =

1873 book by T. B. H. Stenhouse

The Rocky Mountain Saints: A Full and Complete History of the Mormons
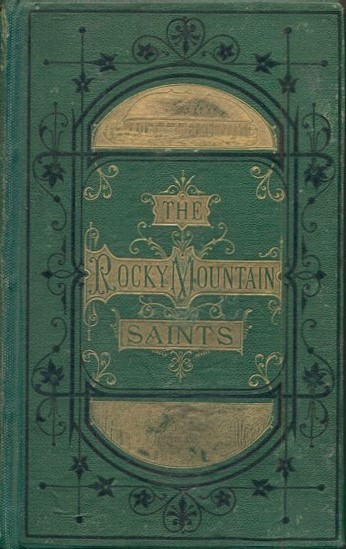
- Author: T. B. H. Stenhouse
- Language: English
- Subject: Latter Day Saint movement
- Published: 1873
- Publication place: United States
- Media type: Print

The Rocky Mountain Saints: A Full and Complete History of the Mormons is an 1873 book by T. B. H. Stenhouse, in which the author gives a thorough treatment of the origins of the Latter Day Saint movement from the perspective of a former member. The book is critical in tone, and is considered by many Mormons to be anti-Mormon.

The book is notable in that it was the first widely available publication containing a critique of the facsimiles in the Book of Abraham, which was made by the Egyptologist Theodule Deveria.

The book contains the earliest known depiction of Joseph Smith's First Vision.

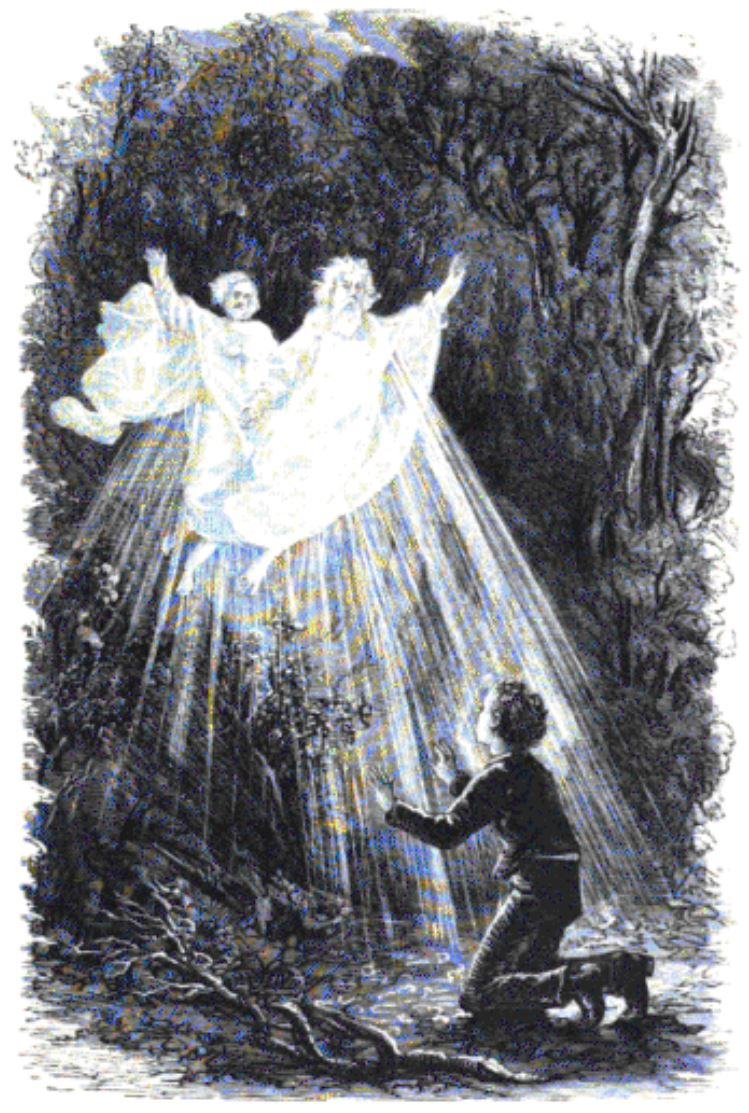
Woodcut by J. Hoey of Joseph Smith's First Vision first published in 1873 in T. B. H. Stenhouse's book Rocky Mountain Saints
