= Oliblish =

Star or planet in Latter-day Saint theology

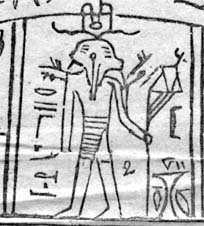
Detail of Figure No. 2 (the Hypocephalus of Sheshonq), which in Restorationist theology represents a governing planet, second in importance to Kolob.

Oliblish is the name given to a star or planet described in the Book of Abraham, a text considered sacred to many denominations of the Latter Day Saint movement, including the Church of Jesus Christ of Latter-day Saints. Several Latter Day Saint denominations hold the Book of Abraham to have been translated from an Egyptian papyrus scroll by Joseph Smith, the founder of the movement. According to this work, the term Oliblish was given as the meaning of the main symbols in one of the images of Smith's hypocephalus. Smith stated that the image is meant to represent a heavenly body located nearest to the central Kolob, the planet or star closest to the throne of God.

The image appears on Figure No 2 of the scrolls, over the shoulders of which are jackal heads. In the left hand of the character is the staff of Wepwawet. The figure to the right was not present in the damaged original. The symbol of life is said to be held by this celestial object that represented a symbol of God's power.

== Exegesis ==
Figure interpreted by Joseph Smith as a numerical figure signifying "one thousand" in Egyptian, measuring the time of the planet Oliblish

The first published reference to Oliblish is in the Book of Abraham, first published in March 1842 in Times and Seasons and now included within the Pearl of Great Price as part of the canon of the Latter-Day Saint movement.

Joseph Smith stated that this figure;

Stands next to Kolob, called by the Egyptians Oliblish, which is the next grand governing creation near to the celestial or the place where God resides; holding the key of power also, pertaining to other planets; as revealed from God to Abraham, as he offered sacrifice upon an altar, which he had built unto the Lord.

In Smith's work, Oliblish is understood to be equal to Kolob in its revolution as well as the peculiar measurement of time, that is, diurnal rotation on its axis equals one thousand of our years according to the measurement of the Earth.

The Joseph Smith Papers stated that the word is used to represent one of three central stars from which power emanates to govern all the other creations, including Earth which is called with the term Jah-oh-eh. The text states that this power has been sought out by ancient prophets since the creation of the Earth using the Urim and Thummim.

== Grammar and Alphabet of the Egyptian Grammar ==
The word Oliblish appears in the Grammar and Alphabet of the Egyptian Language (GAEL), an 1835 working document created concurrently with the Book of Abraham by Smith and his associates. Dan Vogel and Brent Metcalfe suggest that the structure of the cosmos outlined in the GAEL perhaps mirrors the priesthood hierarchy, with three governing planets similar to the First Presidency, and twelve additional planets similar to the Quorum of the Twelve Apostles. Because Oliver Cowdery was a member of the First Presidency, and Oliblish was one of the three governing planets, Christopher Smith has speculated that the similarity between the words Oliver and Oliblish might have been intentional.

== LDS Church Scholarship ==
The explanation given by Smith of the imagery in the scrolls stated that the word Oliblish had been used by the Egyptians, although the word doesn't have Egyptian origin. It may have had its origin from the Apocalypse of Abraham where similar references are made to the power of God and the Egyptian concept of the hypocephalus representing all that is encircled by the sun. In the same facsimile, the word is associated with a transliteration Hebrew word, Raukeeyang, meaning the expanse of heaven.

Hugh Nibley and Michael Rhodes suggests these symbols by Smith have been correlated with the symbolism of the Seker-boat in the festival of Seker in Memphis, Egypt.
