= Children of the Dog Star =

- Genre: Science fiction
- Written by: Ken Catran
- Directed by: Chris Bailey
- Country of origin: New Zealand
- No. of episodes: 6

Children of the Dog Star is a science fiction television programme for children produced in New Zealand in 1984. It consists of six episodes of 24-minutes each. It was written by Ken Catran and directed by Chris Bailey, with the novelisation written by Marie Stuttard.

== Plot synopsis ==
On holiday at her uncle's farm in New Zealand, Gretchen befriends Ronny, a Māori boy with a troubled city past, and Bevis, the birdwatching son of a loathed developer. Tension is already high as the developer wants to buy and drain a local swamp for a housing estate, but Ronny's uncle is the guardian of a traditional Māori tapu (taboo/curse) upon the swamp. The swamp must not be touched—something sleeps there that must not be awakened.

In the story, twelve-year-old Gretchen has a passion for science and a talent for all things mechanical, which is why the strange old brass "weathervane" (referred to as the "daisy rod") on her uncle's farm fascinates her. But the brass daisy rod has a complex and terrifying significance, and Gretchen and her new friend Ronny discover its links with the far distant Sirius, the Dog Star.

Gradually, the children discover the pieces of an ancient alien space probe named Kolob. During the series they assemble the missing parts and strange things start to happen. The probe was one of three sent to earth to educate the human race in science. In the end a communication link is set up with the star Sirius B, from where the probe came, and the aliens tell them they (the aliens) should not have interfered.

== Episodes ==
No.	Title	Directed by	Original release date
1	"The Brass Daisy"	Chris Bailey	September 2, 1985
2	"Power Stop"	Chris Bailey	September 5, 1985
3	"Swamp Light"	Chris Bailey	September 9, 1985
4	"Alien Summons"	Chris Bailey	September 12, 1985
5	"Kolob"	Chris Bailey	September 16, 1985
6	"Alien Contact"	Chris Bailey	September 19, 1985

== Reception ==
Bronwyn Watson in the Sydney Morning Herald wrote "I watched the first two episodes and found Children of the Dog Star disappointing. Of course, with the likes of Star Wars, ET and Close Encounters of the Third Kind, audiences have become very sophisticated. It makes it extremely difficult to do science fiction on a small budget, and get away with it." Jill Morris in the Age's Green Guide says "The Children of the Dog Star is hardly action-packed, but it rumbles with potential menace, assisted by evocative music." She later write "The producer of Children the Dog Star, Catarina de Nave (who has a continuing interest in astronomy and archaeology) and the scriptwriter Ken Catran have interwoven a number of fascinating strands in this space story based in the swamps of a New Zealand farm."

== Availability ==
For a long time, Children of the Dog Star remained unavailable due to complex copyright issues, but TVNZ released the series on DVD (as of 3 July 2009), and syndicated the show to certain North American PBS stations. The series was also broadcast in Czechoslovakia, Malaysia, Bulgaria, the Netherlands, Slovakia, Hong Kong, Australia, Poland, Canada, Greece and the United Kingdom during the mid and late 1980s. Dubbings were made in Czech and Slovak. Since 2011, the series has been available on YouTube.

== Awards ==
It won the Golden Gate Award at the San Francisco International Film Festival in 1984, as well as the New Zealand Feltex 1984 best drama award.

== Adaptation ==
A novelisation, written by Marie Stuttard, was released in 1985 (ISBN 0-340-38490-5).
