= Joseph Smith Hypocephalus =

Papyrus fragment, part of the original Joseph Smith Papyri

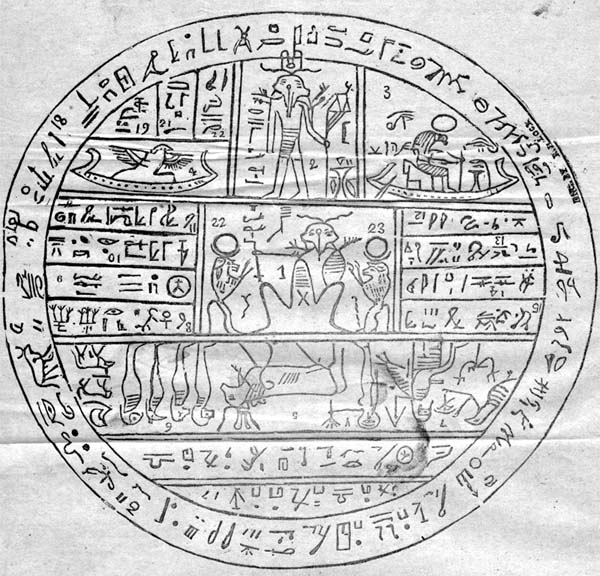
Facsimile No. 2 from Times and Seasons, with missing sections (lacunae) filled in.

The Joseph Smith Hypocephalus (also known as the Hypocephalus of Sheshonq or Facsimile Number 2) (Note: Sometimes given in translations as Shishaq, Shoshenq, S'es'enq.) was a papyrus fragment, part of a larger collection of papyri known as the Joseph Smith Papyri. The papyri are Egyptian funerary papyrus fragments from ancient Thebes dated between 300 and 100 BC which, along with four mummies, were once owned by Joseph Smith, the founder of the Latter Day Saint movement. The name of the owner Sheshonq is written in the hieroglyphic text on the hypocephalus. Smith purchased the mummies and papyrus documents from a traveling exhibitor in Kirtland, Ohio in 1835. Smith said that the hypocephalus contained records of the ancient patriarch Abraham. In 1842, Smith published the first part of the Book of Abraham, which he said was an inspired translation from the papyri. The consensus among both Mormon and non-Mormon scholars is that the characters on the surviving papyrus fragments do not match Smith's translation.

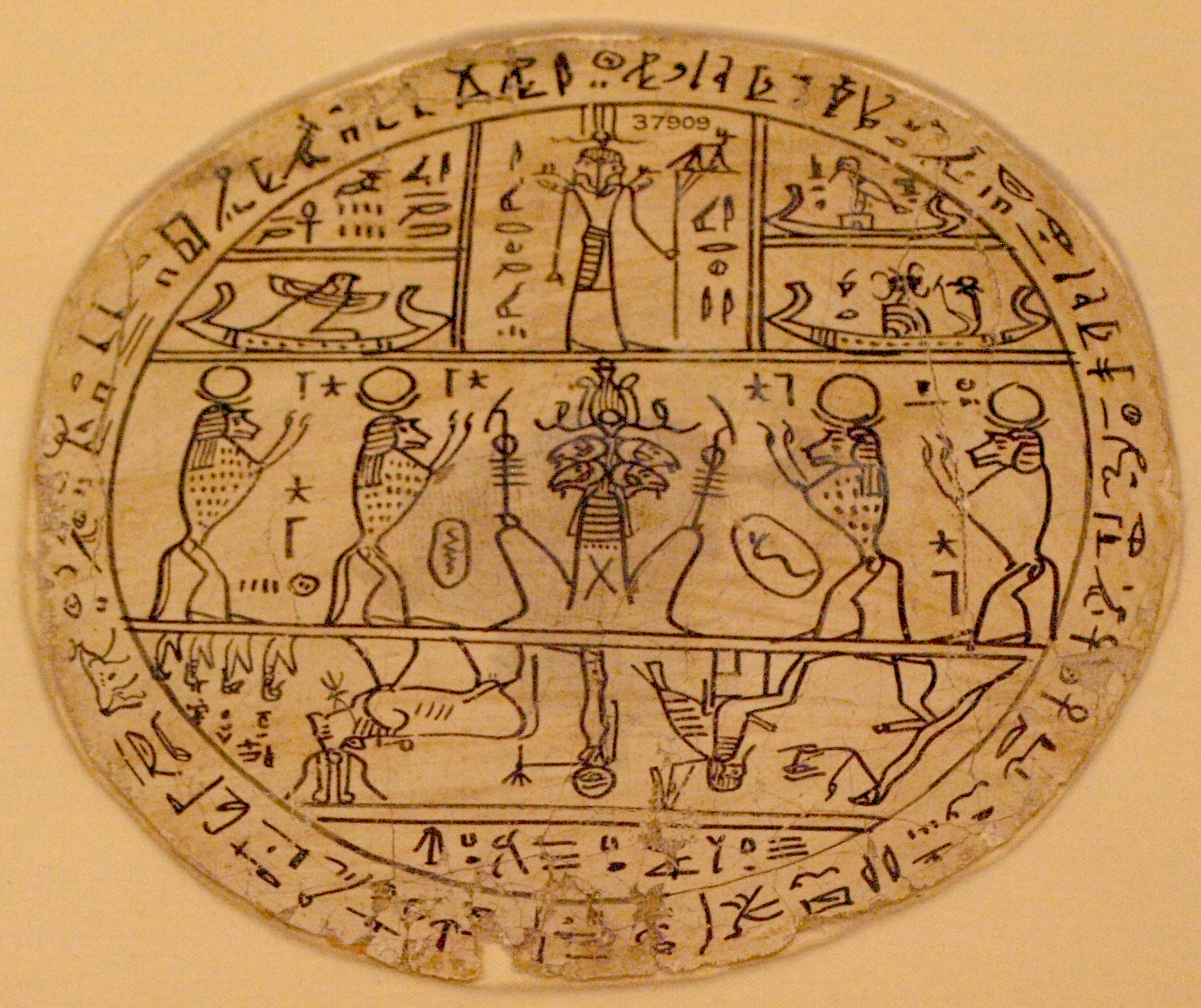
Similar hypocephalus from around 300 BCE

Multiple hypocephali in the British Museum are very similar to the Joseph Smith hypocephalus in layout and text, and were also uncovered in Thebes, Egypt. Other hypocephali also bear a strong resemblance.

A woodcut image of the hypocephalus was initially published in 1842 in the Latter Day Saint newspaper Times and Seasons, two years before the death of Joseph Smith. This image is included as one of several appendices to the Book of Abraham, where it is called Facsimile No. 2. The Book of Abraham has been considered canonical scripture as part of the Pearl of Great Price by members of the Church of Jesus Christ of Latter-day Saints (LDS Church) since 1880. The condition and location of the original document are unknown.

== Hypocephali ==
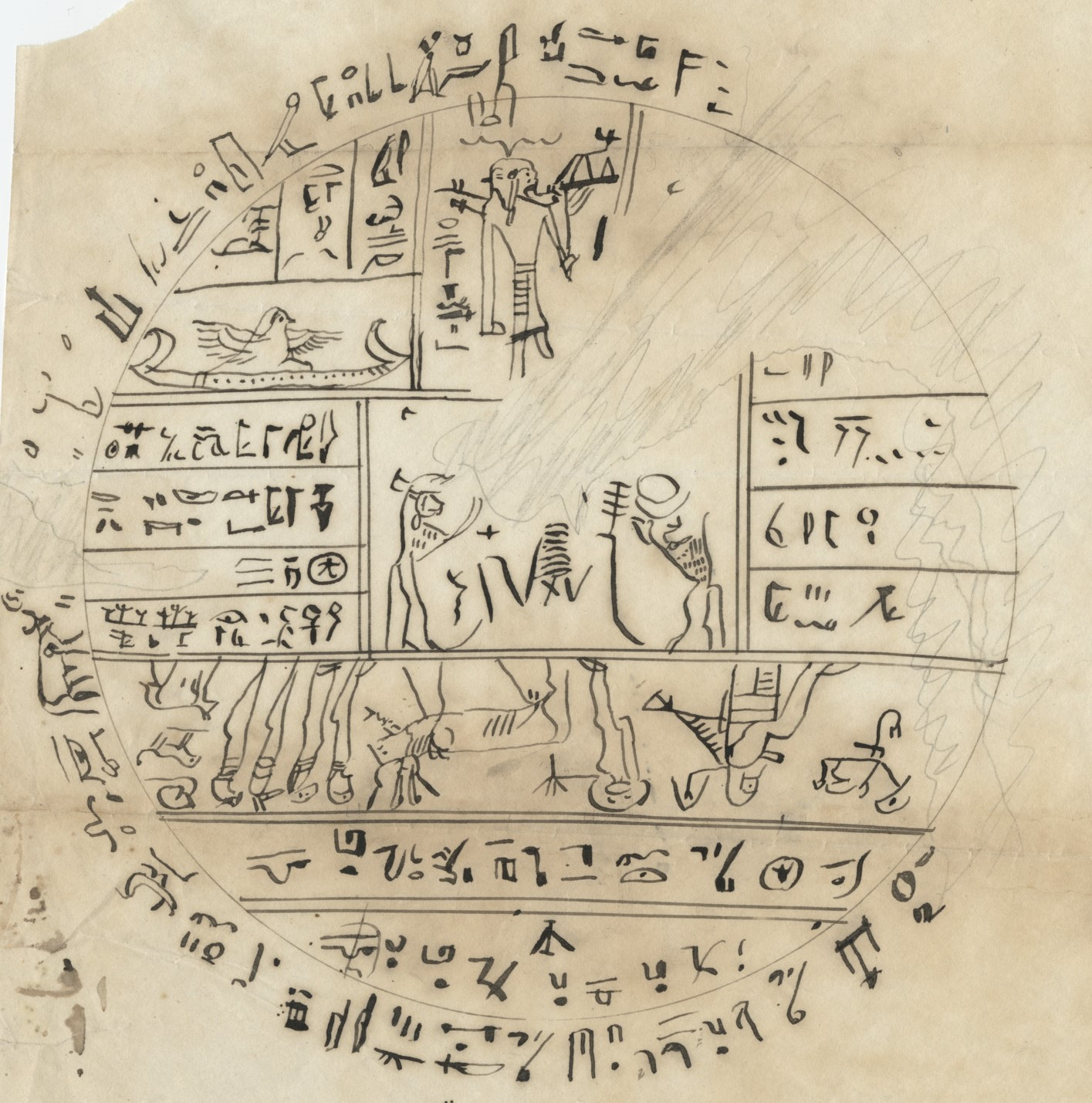
A copy of the original document owned by Smith showing the missing portions, from the Kirtland Egyptian Papers

Hypocephali are small disk-shaped objects, generally made of stuccoed linen, but also of papyrus, bronze, gold, wood, or clay, which ancient Egyptians from the Late Period onwards placed under the heads of their dead.

They were believed to protect the deceased, causing the head and body to be enveloped in light and warmth, thereby making the deceased divine. Hypocephali symbolized the Eye of Ra (later the Eye of Horus), which represented the sun, and the scenes portrayed on them relate to Egyptian ideas of resurrection and life after death, connecting them with the Osirian resurrection myth.

To the ancient Egyptians, the daily setting and rising of the sun was a symbol of death and rebirth. The hypocephalus represented all that the sun encircles—the world of the living, over which it passed during the day, was depicted in the upper half, and that of the dead, which it crossed during the night, in the lower portion.

They were part of the burial materials created by Egyptians from the Twenty-sixth Dynasty (600 BCE) onward and are considered anachronistic to the time period that the biblical Abraham would have lived. Chapter 162 of the Book of the Dead version of that period contain directions for the making and use of hypocephali.

Modern egyptologist's interpretation of the lower scene from the hypocephalus. Nehebkau (left) with a falcon head and serpent body presents an Eye of Ra to the seated Min. Wadjet (center), represented with an Eye of Ra as her head, holds a lotus blossom out behind Hathor in cow form, who faces the four sons of Horus (right).

== Interpretation of images (Figures No. 1–7, 22–23) ==
There is still some ambiguity regarding how these Egyptian names and text may have been pronounced.

The numbers labeling the figures were added to correspond to explanations of the images and text given by Joseph Smith.

=== Figure No. 1 ===
A. Modern interpretation of Figures 1, 22, 23.

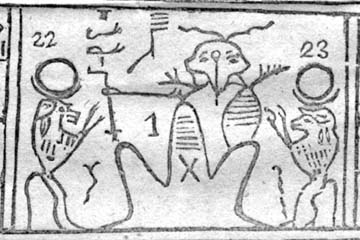
B. Detail of Figures 1, 22, 23.

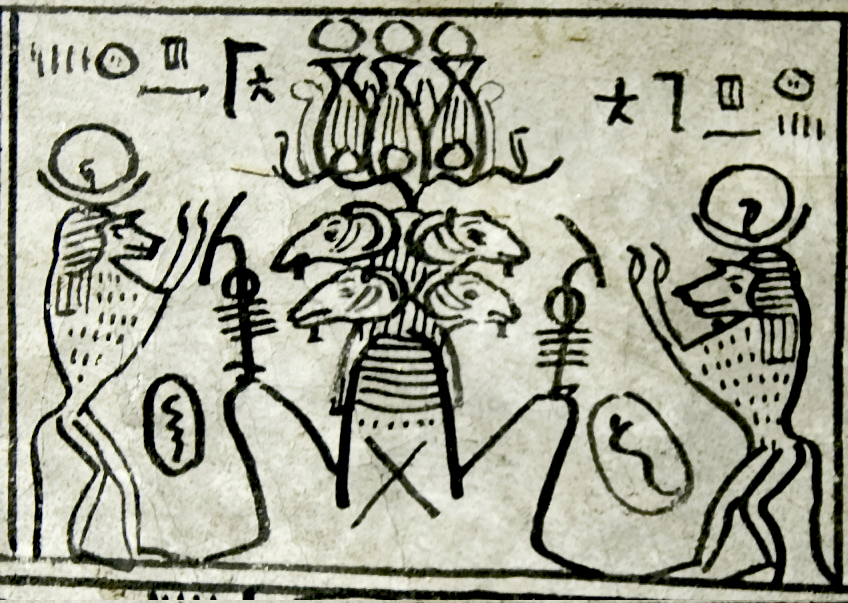
C.the equivalent figure from the Hypocephalus of Tanetirt, showing four heads on the central neck.

Figure 1 has been described as the god Re-Atum, typically depicted with four heads. The original copy is missing the head portion of this figure, and it is possible Smith copied the heads and shoulders of Figure 2. Other sources state it's depicting Khnum.

Left of center is the was scepter or similar-looking djam scepter.

Joseph Smith described figure 1 as;

Kolob, signifying the first creation, nearest to the celestial, or the residence of God. First in government, the last pertaining to the measurement of time. The measurement according to celestial time, which celestial time signifies one day to a cubit. One day in Kolob is equal to a thousand years according to the measurement of this earth, which is called by the Egyptians Jah-oh-eh.

=== Figures No. 22 and 23 ===
Figures 22 and 23 are apes with lunar disks appearing above their heads.

Joseph Smith described figures 22 and 23 as: "the medium of Kli-flos-is-es, or Hah-ko-kau-beam, the stars represented by numbers (figures) 22 and 23, receiving light from the revolutions of Kolob."

=== Figure No. 2 ===
A. Modern interpretation of Figure No. 2.

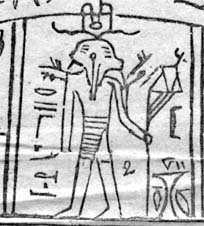
B: Detail of Figure No. 2.

On his shoulders are jackal heads. In his left hand is the staff of Wepwawet. The figure to the right was not present in the damaged original.

Joseph Smith stated that this figure;

Stands next to Kolob, called by the Egyptians Oliblish, which is the next grand governing creation near to the celestial or the place where God resides; holding the key of power also, pertaining to other planets; as revealed from God to Abraham, as he offered sacrifice upon an altar, which he had built unto the Lord.

=== Figure No. 3 ===
Figure 3 is located in the missing section of the hypocephalus. Prior to printing, the section was filled in. The text on the rim surrounding the figure has been replaced by text from the unrelated Breathing Permit of Hôr. Similarly, figure 3 is also foreign to the hypocephalus. Despite the striking resemblance, Nibley and some other apologists feel that the boat is inspired, because boats sometimes do appear in that section on hypocephali. Egyptologists dispute this, arguing that just like the surrounding text, the inclusion by Joseph Smith (or his engravers) is irrelevant.

A. Modern interpretation of Figure No. 3.

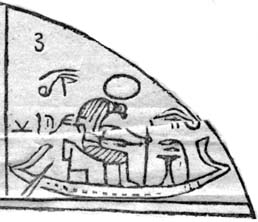
B: Detail of Figure No. 3.

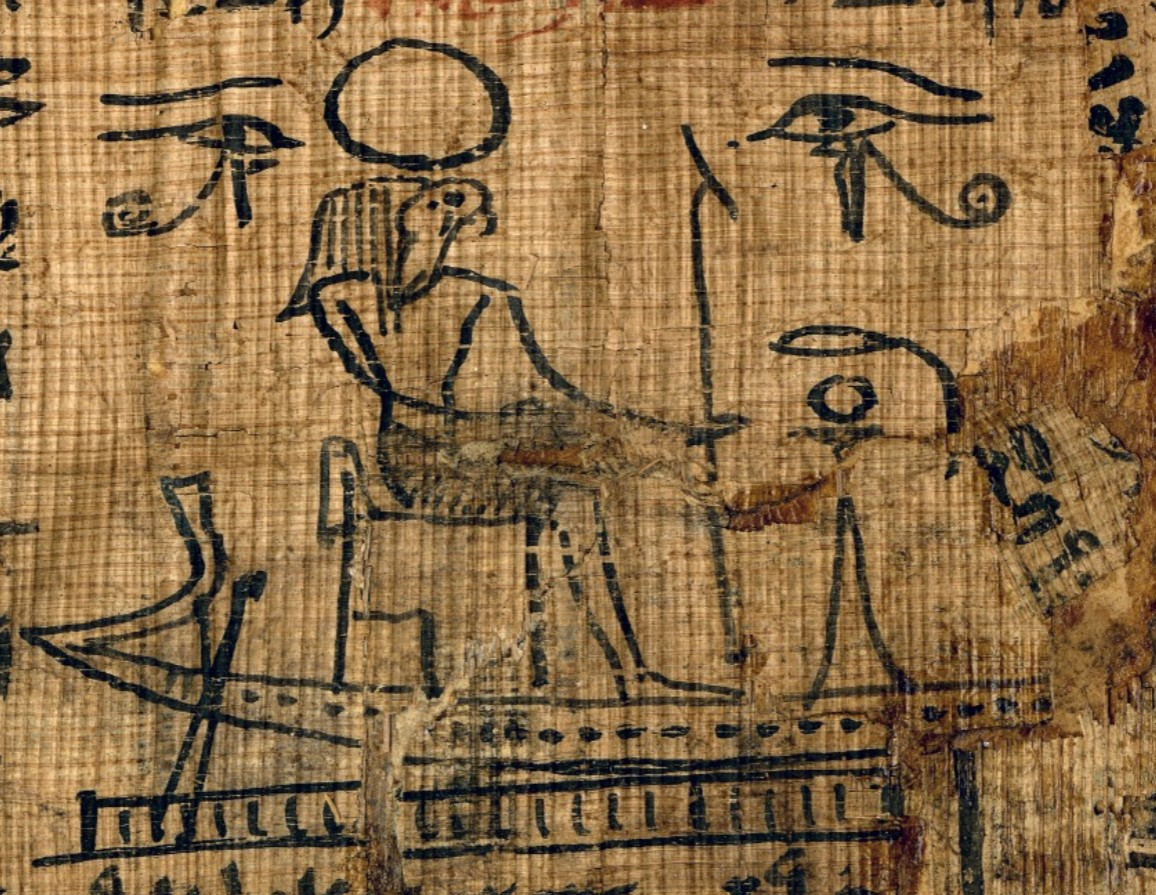
C: Ta-Sherit-Min scroll, from which Figure No. 3 likely copied.

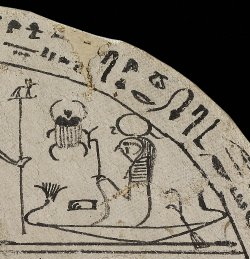
D: Similar image, but facing toward the centre and including a representation of Khepri, from the Hypocephalus of Neshorpakhered.

A solar barque carrying the seated falcon headed god Re, holding a was scepter. The solar disk is over Re's head. A divine Eye of Horus is on both sides of Re and the solar barque.

Also on the barque is an offering stand. The two characters farthest to the left may be an attempt to engrave dp.t ntr, which would translate as "Divine Ship":

R8 P1

Joseph Smith's interpretation:

Is made to represent God, sitting upon his throne, clothed with power and authority; with a crown of eternal light upon his head; representing also the grand Key-words of the Holy Priesthood, as revealed to Adam in the Garden of Eden, as also to Seth, Noah, Melchizedek, Abraham, and all to whom the Priesthood was revealed.

=== Figure No. 4 ===
A. Modern interpretation of Figure No. 4

B. Figure No. 4

A falcon, representing Sokar sitting on a mummy case, with outstretched wings, sitting upon a papyrus boat. The Coffin Texts state: "He takes the ship of 1000 cubits from end to end and he sails it to the stairway of fire."

Joseph Smith's interpretation:

Answers to the Hebrew word Raukeeyang, signifying expanse, or the firmament of the heavens; also a numerical figure, in Egyptian signifying one thousand; answering to the measuring of the time of Oliblish, which is equal with Kolob in its revolution and in its measuring of time.

=== Figure No. 5 ===
A. Modern interpretation of Figure No. 5

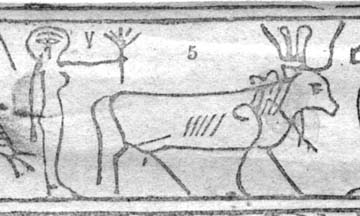
B. Figure No. 5

A cow, representing Hathor, the heavenly cow. Behind is a standing female figure with the Eye of Horus depicted on her head and holding out a water lily in her left hand.

Joseph Smith's interpretation: "Called in Egyptian Enish-go-on-dosh; this is one of the governing planets also, and is said by the Egyptians to be the Sun, and to borrow its light from Kolob through the medium of Kae-e-vanrash, which is the grand Key, or, in other words, the governing power, which governs fifteen other fixed planets or stars, as also Floeese or the Moon, the Earth and the Sun in their annual revolutions. This planet receives its power through the medium of Kli-flos-is-es, or Hah-ko-kau-beam, the stars represented by numbers 22 and 23, receiving light from the revolutions of Kolob."

=== Figure No. 6 ===
A. Modern interpretation of Figure No. 6

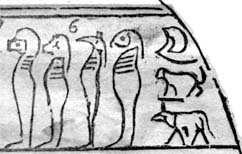
B. Figure No. 6

Four standing figures, representing the four sons of Horus. They are the patron gods of the lungs, liver, stomach and intestines, and were the gods of the four corners of the cosmos, or of the four cardinal directions.

Joseph Smith's interpretation: "Represents this earth in its four quarters."

=== Figure No. 7 ===
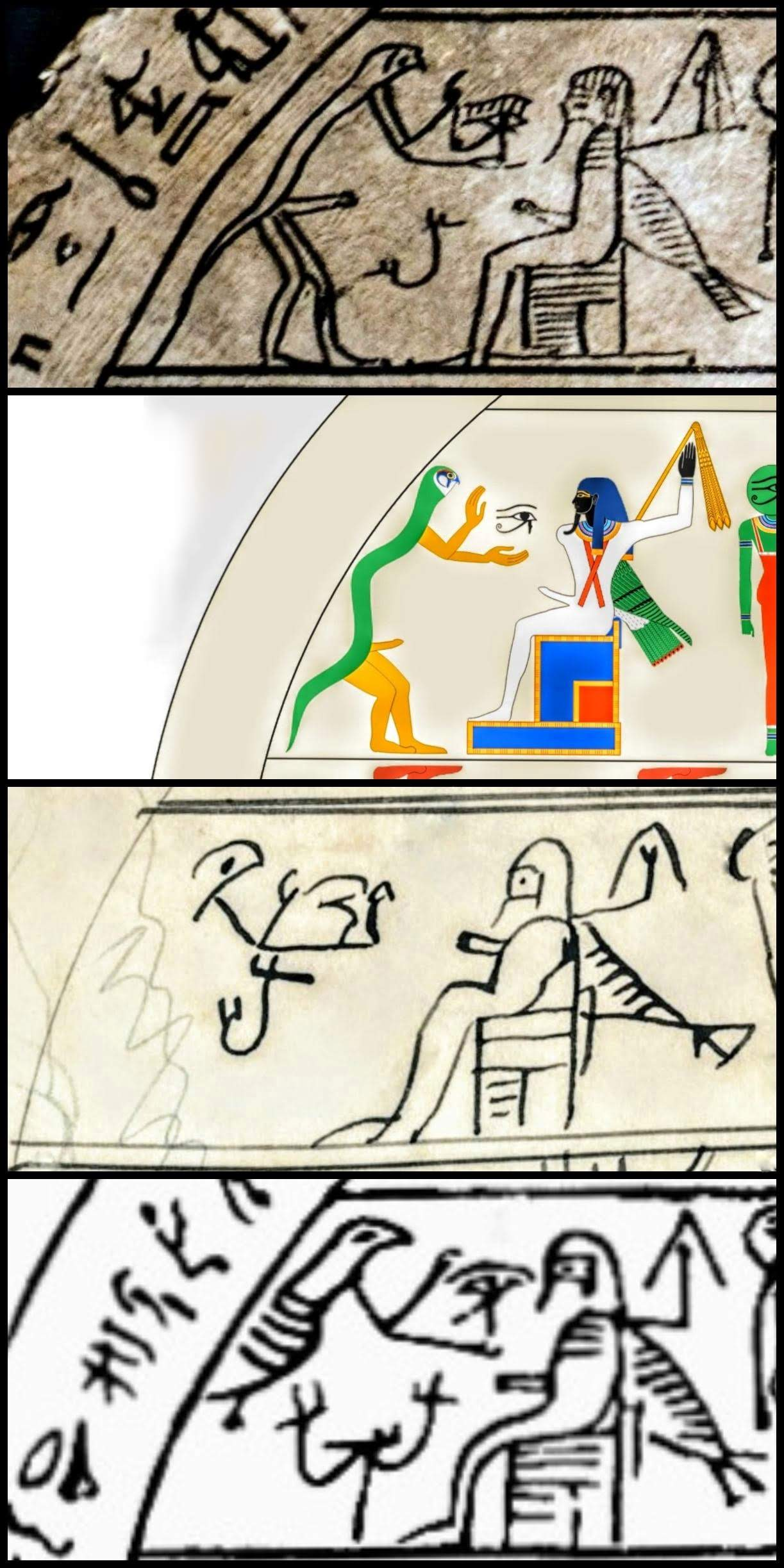
Figure No. 7

1 / Typical hypocephalus; 2 / Modern interpretation of Figure No. 7	3 / Hand copy of Smith's hypocephalus showing missing areas; 4 / Current LDS rendition

The seated figure has been identified with the fertility god Min. LDS and non-LDS scholars agree the depiction appears to be an ithyphallic figure (i.e. depicted with an erect penis). To the left is a figure identified as the serpent god Nehebkau with a falcon head (also commonly depicted as ithyphallic), presenting the Eye of Ra.

Joseph Smith's interpretation:

Represents God sitting upon his throne, revealing through the heavens the grand Key-words of the Priesthood; as, also, the sign of the Holy Ghost unto Abraham, in the form of a dove.

The penis of the figure Smith said represented God was removed in the LDS church's 1913 reprinting of the facsimile, but has been restored in more current editions.

== Text to the left (Figures No. 8–11) ==
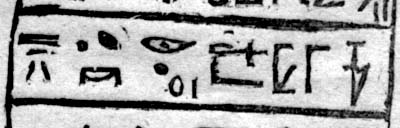
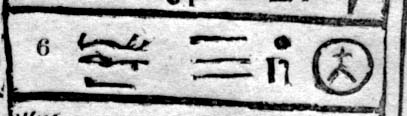
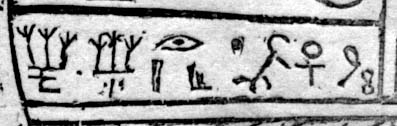
Figure No. 11	Detail of Figure No. 11	"O god, sleeping in the time"
Figure No. 10	Detail of Figure No. 10	"of the beginning. Great God, Lord of Heaven and earth,"
Figure No. 9	Detail of Figure No. 9	"and below the earth and of the waters" (Damaged in the original.)
Figure No. 8	Detail of Figure No. 8	"Grant that the Ba of Osiris Sheshonq live."

Theodule Deveria gave the following translation: "O great God in Sekhem; O great God, Lord of heaven, earth and hell. ... Osiris S'es'enq."

Robert K. Ritner gives the following translation: "O noble god from the beginning of time, great god, lord of heaven, earth, underworld, waters [and mountains,] cause the ba-spirit of the Osiris Sheshonq to live." (brackets and italics in original)

Joseph Smith said of figure 8 in particular, "Contains writings that cannot be revealed unto the world; but is to be had in the Holy Temple of God."

== Text to the right (Figures No. 12–15) ==
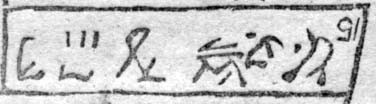
Figure No. 12	Detail of Figure No. 12
Figure No. 13	Detail of Figure No. 13
Figure No. 14	Detail of Figure No. 14
Figure No. 15	Detail of Figure No. 15

The right portion of these characters are hieratic and appear to have been copied from Joseph Smith Papyrus XI.

Included is sn-sn:

N35 O34 N35 O34

Val Sederholm has identified that the surviving traces of the original content parallel other hypocephali, and suggested the reading j nTr pfy 'A, 'nx m TAw, jw m mw: 'q r' jw [=r] sDm md.t=f. [Mj n] Wsjr, stating that "the officiator, calling upon that special, particular, transcendent god, who lives by breathing, who negotiates the waters, pleads from the depths: May Re descend to hear Osiris' words! Come to Shoshenq, who is dead!"

== Text at the bottom (Figures No. 16–17) ==
Detail of Figure No. 17

Detail of Figure No. 16

Figure No. 17: (h3t)tomb. (thy)desecration. (nn) strong negative.
Figure No. 16: "is not to be disturbed along with its Lord in the Duat forever."

Robert K. Ritner gives the following translation: "Back, injury, back! There is none who attacks you. This ba-spirit and his lord will not be attacked in the underworld forever."

== Text around the rim (Figure No. 18) ==
One third of the rim contains characters taken from another papyrus, copied upside down and with no literary connection the original two thirds.

Ritner translated it as:

I am the punisher in the Mansion of the Benben in Heliopolis, greatly exalted, greatly [effective], the copulating bull who has no equal, this great god in the Mansion of the Benben in Heliopolis, [... Come to the Osiris Sheshonq, the justified, son of...]. He is that great god in the House of the Noble.

== Text to upper left (Figures No. 19–21, numbered 19, 21–22 in Times and Seasons) ==
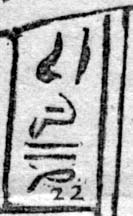
Detail of Figure No. 21

"Behold thou art ever"

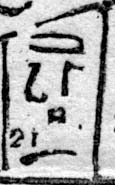
Detail of Figure No. 20

"as this god of thine"

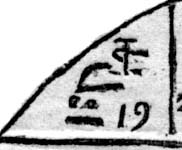
Detail of Figure No. 19

"in(of) Busiris"

== See also ==
- Book of Abraham Egyptian mummies
- Criticism of the Book of Abraham
- Joseph Smith Papyri
- Kirtland Egyptian papers
- Kolob
