= Kolob =

Celestial body that is "nearest unto the throne of God" in LDS theology

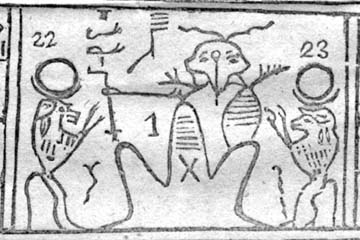
Detail of Facsimile No. 2 (the Hypocephalus of Sheshonq). Reference numeral 1 represents Kolob according to Joseph Smith.

In the Book of Abraham, Kolob (/ˈkoʊlɒb/ KOH-lob) is a star described as the heavenly body nearest to the throne of God. Several Latter Day Saint denominations believe that the Book of Abraham was translated from an ancient Egyptian papyrus scroll by Joseph Smith, founder of the Latter Day Saint movement. While the Book of Abraham calls Kolob a star, it also calls planets stars, and therefore some Latter-day Saint commentators consider Kolob a planet. Kolob also appears in the culture of the Church of Jesus Christ of Latter-day Saints (LDS Church), such as the hymn "If You Could Hie to Kolob."

== Doctrine and exegesis ==
=== Description in the Book of Abraham ===
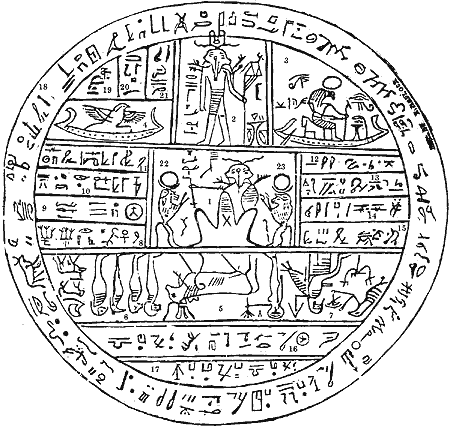
Facsimile No. 2 from the Book of Abraham, which Smith said discusses Kolob. The part Smith said refers to Kolob is numbered by a "1" in the center.

The first published reference to Kolob is in the Book of Abraham, first published in 1842 in Times and Seasons and now included within the Pearl of Great Price as part of the canon of The Church of Jesus Christ of Latter-day Saints. The Book of Abraham 1:1–2:18 were dictated in 1835 and the remaining part in 1842 by Smith after he purchased a set of Egyptian scrolls that accompanied a mummy exhibition. According to Smith, the scrolls described a vision of Abraham, in which Abraham:

saw the stars, that they were very great, and that one of them was nearest unto the throne of God; ... and the name of the great one is Kolob, because it is near unto me, for I am the Lord thy God: I have set this one to govern all those which belong to the same order as that upon which thou standest.

In an explanation of an Egyptian hypocephalus that was part of the Joseph Smith Papyri, Smith interpreted one set of hieroglyphics as representing:

Kolob, signifying the first creation, nearest to the celestial, or the residence of God. First in government, the last pertaining to the measurement of time. The measurement according to celestial time, which celestial time signifies one day to a cubit. One day in Kolob is equal to a thousand years according to the measurement of the Earth, which is called by the Egyptians Jah-oh-eh.

The Book of Abraham describes a hierarchy of heavenly bodies, including the Earth, the Moon, and the Sun, each with different movements and measurements of time, where at the pinnacle, the slowest-rotating body is Kolob, where one Kolob-day corresponds to 1000 Earth-years. The time also applies to other celestial bodies in the vicinity of Kolob, such as Oliblish, and other neighboring objects. This is similar to Psalm 90:4, which says, "For a thousand years in [God's] sight are but as yesterday when it is past" and 2 Peter 3:8, which says, "one day is with the Lord as a thousand years". Additional, similar information about Kolob is found in the Kirtland Egyptian Papers, constituting manuscripts in the handwriting of Smith and his scribes.

=== Mormon exegesis and speculation ===
According to the traditional, literal Mormon interpretation of the Book of Abraham, Kolob is an actual star in this universe that is, or is near, the physical throne of God. According to Smith, this star was discovered by Methuselah and Abraham by looking through Urim and Thummim, a set of seer stones bound into a pair of spectacles. LDS Church leader and historian B. H. Roberts (1857–1933) interpreted Smith's statements to mean that the Solar System and its governing "planet" (the Sun) revolved around a star known as Kae-e-vanrash, which itself revolved with its own solar system around a star called Kli-flos-is-es or Hah-ko-kau-beam, which themselves revolve around Kolob, which he characterized as "the great centre of that part of the universe to which our planetary system belongs". Roberts was confident that astronomers would confirm this hierarchy of stars orbiting other stars.

==== Star or planet ====
The Book of Abraham is unclear as to whether Kolob is a star or a planet, and Mormon writings have taken both positions. One part of the Book of Abraham states that Abraham "saw the stars ... and that one of them was nearest unto the throne of God; ... and the name of the great one is Kolob." But the book defines the word Kokaubeam (a transliteration of the Hebrew "כּוֹכָבִים" [cf., Gen. 15:5]) as meaning "all the great lights, which were in the firmament of heaven". This would appear to include planets as among the "stars", and the Book of Abraham calls Earth a star. In addition, it appears to classify Kolob among a hierarchy of "planets". On the other hand, in the Egyptian Alphabet and Grammar paper, Kolob is classified as one of 12 "fixed stars", as distinct from 15 "moving planets". The term "fixed stars" generally refers to the background of celestial objects that do not appear to move relative to each other in the night sky, including all stars other than the Sun, nebulae and other starlike objects. Though "fixed", such objects were proven to have proper motion by Edmund Halley in 1718. Apparently referring to proper motion, Smith said that Kolob moves "swifter than the rest of the twelve fixed stars". Also, the Book of Abraham refers to "fixed planets", thereby including planets in the set of celestial objects that may be "fixed". It also calls the Sun a "governing planet", further complicating the terminology. So it is unclear whether Smith understood Kolob to be a planet or a star.

Writers in the Latter Day Saint movement have taken both positions on the issue. Brigham Young, second president of the LDS Church, spoke of Kolob as a planet, as did LDS Church apostles John Taylor, Orson Pratt (a mathematician with an interest in astronomy), Orson F. Whitney, and Alvin R. Dyer. Other Mormon theologians have also viewed Kolob as a planet, but several Mormon writers have called Kolob a star, including B. H. Roberts and LDS Church president David O. McKay.

==== Birthplace for the Earth ====
According to several Mormon writers (such as W. Cleon Skousen in his book The First 2000 Years), the Earth was created near Kolob over a period of 6,000 years, then moved to its present position in the Solar System. This hypothesis is based on oral comments attributed to Smith. The hypothesis is also based on a passage from the Book of Abraham stating that in the Garden of Eden, time was measured "after the Lord's time, which was after the time of Kolob; for as yet the Gods had not appointed to Adam his reckoning". According to the hypothesis, the reason that Earth time was measured in Kolob time was that the Earth was near Kolob. As a corollary, some Mormon writers argue that at the end times, the Earth will be plucked from the Solar System and returned to its original orbit near Kolob.

LDS Church apostle Bruce R. McConkie came to a different conclusion, arguing that during the first "day" of creation (not necessarily a 1,000-year "day" in Kolob time, a "day" meaning a phase of creation), Earth was formed and placed in orbit around the Sun.

The idea that the Earth was formed elsewhere and then migrated to orbit around the Sun does not accord with the scientific theory of Earth's formation, which is that the Earth formed in orbit around the Sun about 4.5 billion years ago by accretion from a protoplanetary disk, and has remained near its original orbit until the present.

==== Speculative astronomy ====
Several Mormon authors have attempted to situate Kolob within modern astronomy. Skousen speculated that Kolob is a star at the Galactic Center, Sagittarius A*, of our own galaxy. This view also had the support of several former general authorities of the LDS Church, including J. Reuben Clark and George Reynolds (with Janne M. Sjödahl). In the mid-19th century, early efforts to find a single "central sun" in the galaxy failed.

Another Mormon author has hypothesized that Kolob exists outside the Milky Way at a place called the "metagalactic center", and that this galaxy and other galaxies rotate around it. Within mainstream astronomy, the idea of a metagalactic center was once assumed, but has been abandoned because on large scales, the expanding universe has no gravitational center.

Another Mormon author has speculated that Kolob is Polaris.

=== Metaphorical exegesis ===
In addition to the literal interpretation of Kolob as an actual heavenly body, the LDS Church has proposed that Kolob is also "a symbol of Jesus Christ", in that like Kolob, Jesus "governs" all the stars and planets similar to the Earth.

== Analysis and criticism ==
=== Origin ===
Some Mormon scholars have sought to link the Kolob doctrine to ancient astronomy. Gee, Hamblin & Peterson (2006) have sought to show that this astronomy is more consistent with ancient geocentrism than with 19th-century Copernican and Newtonian astronomy, and thus carries with it the misconceptions of ancient astronomy. For example, in their interpretation, Kolob is the highest and slowest moving of a series of concentric heavenly spheres, which are centered on Earth. These authors believe that Smith, in the 19th century, would not have made this geocentric mistake about Kolob, and therefore, they argue that the Book of Abraham is of ancient origin. John Tvedtnes suggested that "Another possible Hebrew etymology is the Hebrew KLB 'dog' originally pronounced kalb just as it is in Arabic. This is used to denote the star Regulus in Arabic while the Syriac, which is also kalb denotes the star Sirius, the brightest star in the heavens." He also suggested that the Hebraic use of "KLB" as both the word dog and an astronomical term refers to the universality of Sirius as the "Dog Star".

According to Fawn Brodie, Smith's idea of Kolob may have been derived from the "throne of God" idea found in Thomas Dick's The Philosophy of a Future State, which Brodie said Smith "had recently been reading" before dictating the Book of Abraham, and which "made a lasting impression" on him.

== In popular culture ==
=== "If You Could Hie to Kolob" ===
"If You Could Hie to Kolob" (hie, hurry) is a Latter-day Saint hymn by early Mormon W. W. Phelps. The music is taken from a well-known folk tune known as "Dives and Lazarus". It was originally published in 1842 in Times and Seasons and is hymn number 284 in the LDS Church's current hymnal. The hymn makes only one reference to Kolob, in its first line (from which the hymn's title is derived). It is the only hymn in the current hymnal that mentions Kolob.

The hymn reflects doctrines unique to Mormonism, such as the eternal nature of spirit (including man's spirit) and matter. It also conveys doctrines elaborated by Smith, the first Latter-day Saint prophet, about the plurality of gods and eternal progression.

The tune was arranged by Ralph Vaughan Williams (1906) for the English Hymnal and can be found in today's hymnals under the name "Kingsfold". The tune is also used in other hymns: "O Sing a Song of Bethlehem", "I Heard the Voice of Jesus", and "We Sing the Mighty Power of God".

The tune was also arranged for use in the film Plan 10 from Outer Space.

=== Kolob as the inspiration for Kobol in Battlestar Galactica ===
Some of the elements of the two Battlestar Galactica science-fiction television shows seem to be derived from the Mormon beliefs of its creator and chief producer, Glen A. Larson. In both the original series from 1978, and the 2003 new series, the planet Kobol is the ancient and distant mother world of the entire human race and the planet where life began, and the "Lords of Kobol" are sacred figures to the human race. They are treated as elders or patriarchs in the old series, and versions of the Twelve Olympians in the new series. According to academic Jana Riess, this is one of many plot points that Larson borrowed from Mormonism.

=== Other instances ===
- Zion National Park has a region known as Kolob Canyons.
- The song "I Believe" from the musical The Book of Mormon includes the line "I believe that God lives on a planet called Kolob."
- The 1984 TV serial Children of the Dog Star features an alien space probe named Kolob, and "Kolob" is the title of the fifth episode.
- The Osmonds used the title Kolob on many of their albums for their record label and recording studio.

== See also ==
- Criticism of the Book of Abraham
- Kirtland Egyptian papers
- Mormon cosmology
- Godhead
