= Kirtland Egyptian papers =

Documents related to translation of the Book of Abraham

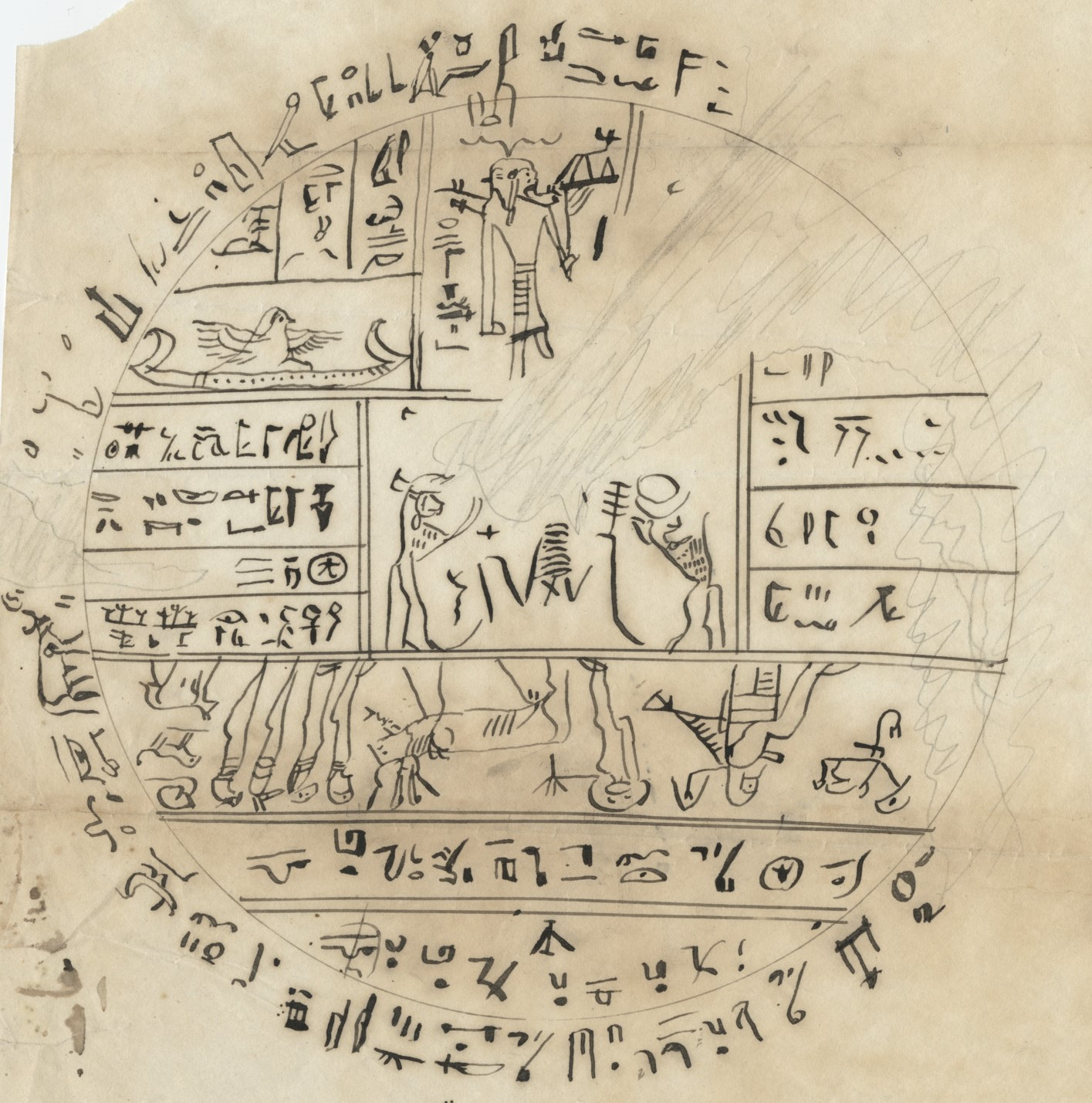
An early drawing of one vignette in the Joseph Smith Papyrus which is included in the Kirtland Egyptian Papers. A print of this vignette without the lacuna was later published in the Book of Abraham.

The Kirtland Egyptian papers (KEP) are a collection of documents related to the Book of Abraham created in Kirtland between July and November 1835, and in Nauvoo between March through May 1842. Because some documents were created in Nauvoo, the collection is sometimes referred to as the Book of Abraham and Related Manuscripts and Joseph Smith Egyptian Papers.

The papers include an "Egyptian alphabet" written in the hand of Joseph Smith, other Egyptian language related materials and early manuscript versions of the Book of Abraham in the handwriting of Oliver Cowdery, W. W. Phelps, Warren Parish, Willard Richards, and Frederick G. Williams.

The papers have been a source of controversy, because the translations and interpretations within are not considered accurate by Egyptologists, and have thus stoked questions of whether the Book of Abraham is a literal translation of the Joseph Smith Papyri. Some apologists of the Church of Jesus Christ of Latter-day Saints (LDS Church) have postulated that many of the papers may have been produced by Smith's scribes without his involvement, and that they may have been intended as a speculative or naturalistic effort rather than a product of revelation.

== Content ==
The Kirtland Egyptian papers are housed in the Church History Library of the LDS Church. They comprise over a dozen other documents produced ca. 1835 and 1842 in Kirtland, Ohio, and Nauvoo, Illinois. All dates for production are estimates. Due to controversy about the order of production, there is no generally accepted manuscript numbering scheme. The manuscript numbers (MS #) reported below refer to the folder numbers under which the manuscripts are catalogued in the Church archives. These folder numbers were assigned by Hugh Nibley ca. 1971. The order given below mirrors the authoritative Joseph Smith Papers project.

=== Notebooks of copied Egyptian characters ===
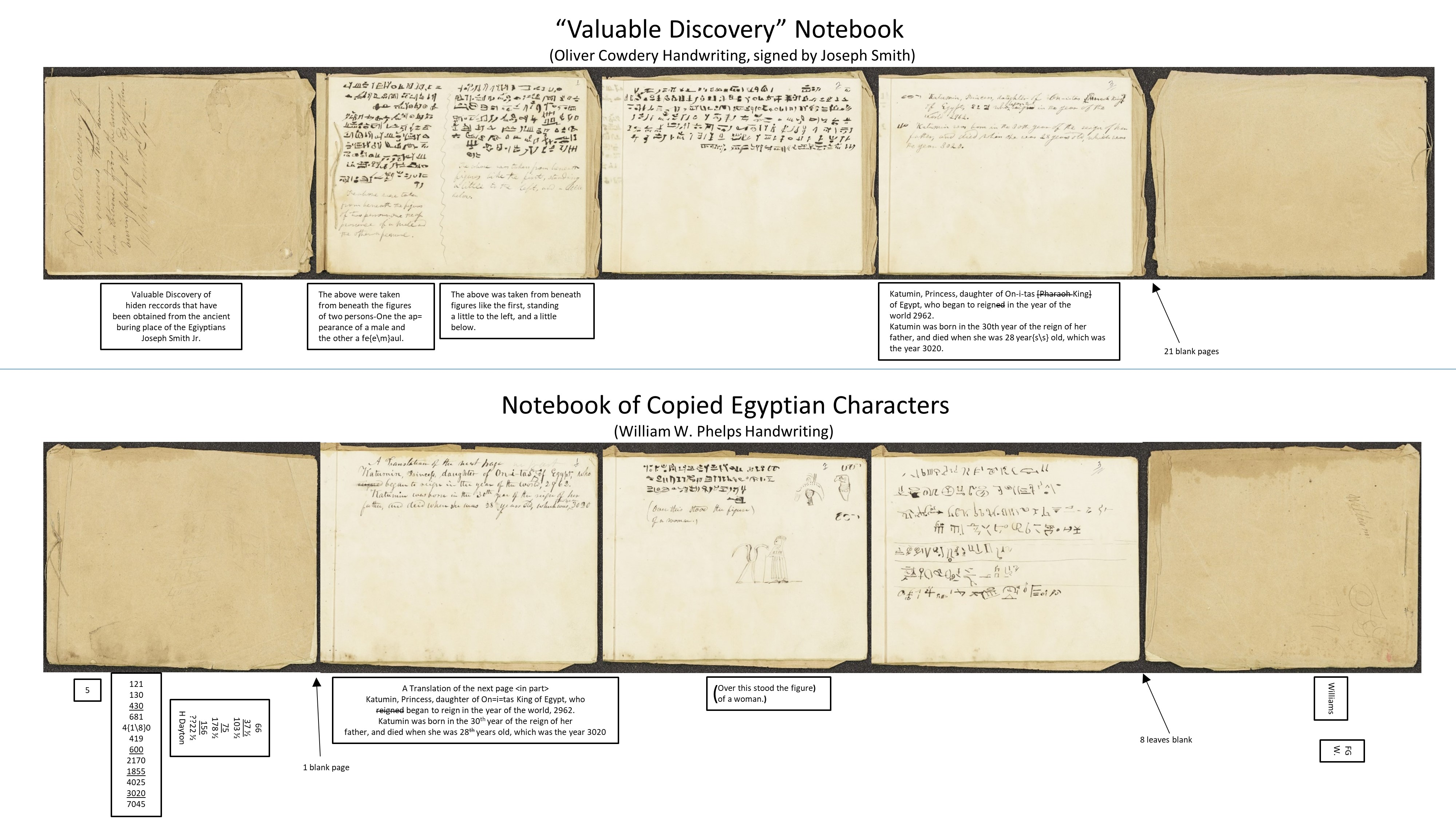
The two notebooks, with English words below

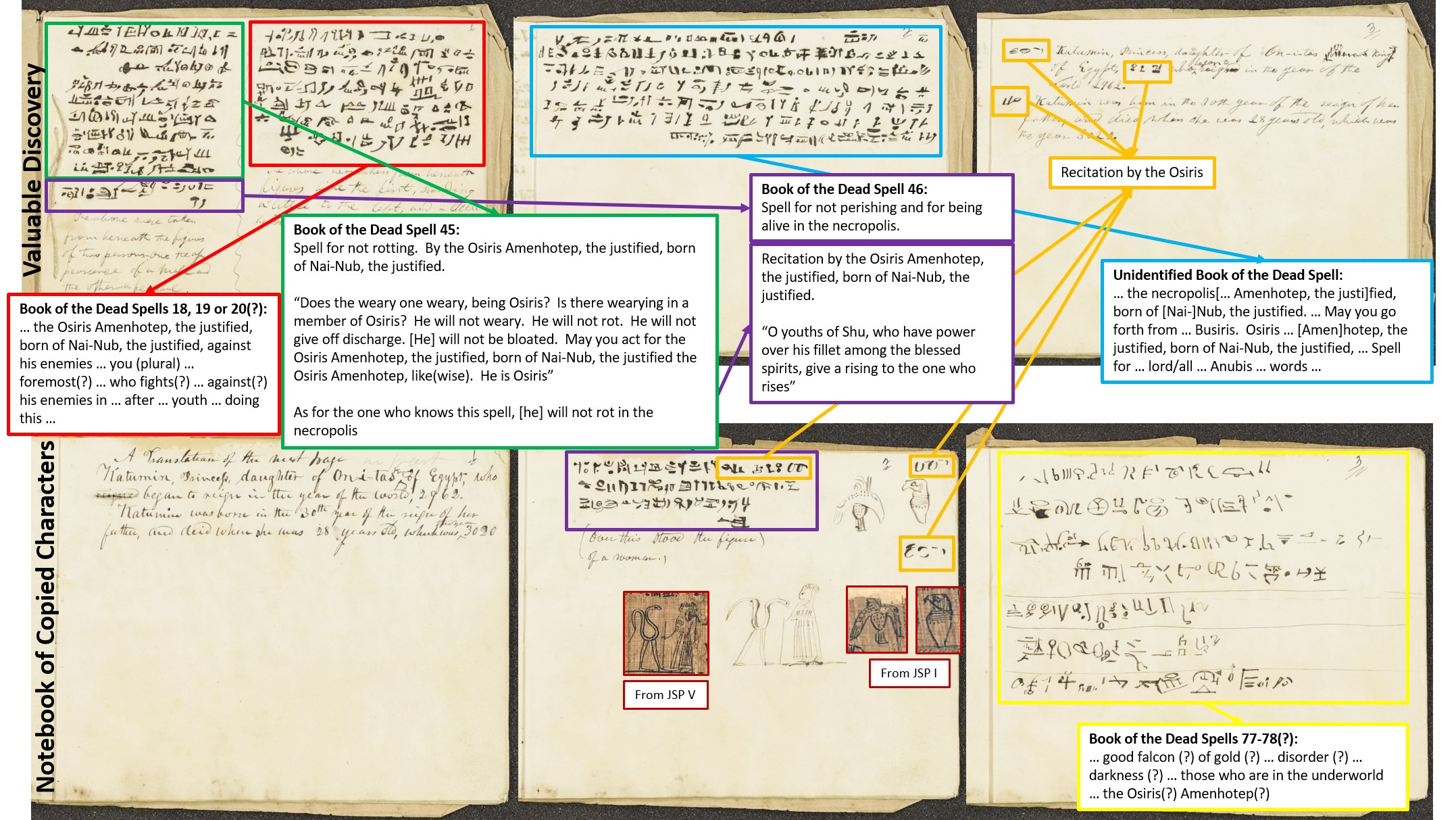
Translation of the copied Egyptian characters from the two notebooks

Title	Dimensions	Description	Handwriting	Date Produced	MS #
"Valuable Discovery"	16 cm × 22 cm (6.3 in × 8.7 in)	Small 24-page notebook (21 blank pages) of copied Egyptian characters from a now non-extant version the Book of the Dead for Amenhotep. The front cover says, "Valuable Discovery of hiden reccords that have been obtained from the ancient buring place of the Egiyptians" [𝘴𝘪𝘤], and is then signed by Joseph Smith Jr.	Oliver Cowdery (English text, likely Egyptian characters), Frederick G. Williams (redaction), Joseph Smith (signature)	Early July 1835	6
Notebook of Copied Egyptian Characters	16 cm × 20 cm (6.3 in × 7.9 in)	Small 24-page notebook (21 blank pages) contains passage found in "Valuable Discovery", with characters and illustrations copied from various papyri.	William W. Phelps. Egyptian characters in unknown handwriting. Frederick G. Williams' name and initials are on the back cover	Early July 1835	7

When Michael Chandler arrived in Kirtland in 1835 with the Egyptian Papyri, he allowed Oliver Cowdery to copy "four or five different sentences" from the papyri. A translation of the lines by Joseph Smith were given to Michael Chandler to his satisfaction. Given that the "Valuable Discovery" notebook was written in Oliver Cowdery's hand, signed by Joseph Smith, with a translation of some of the characters, it is postulated that it is the same notebook.

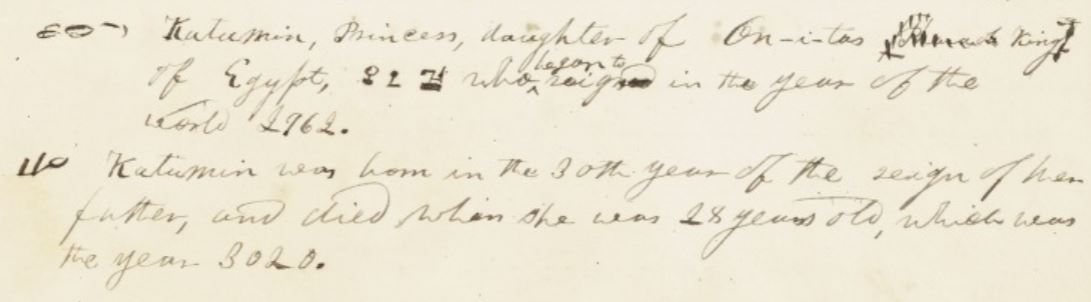
Characters with translations taken from the Valuable Discovery notebook. Some of the characters are mirror images of the Egyptian characters.

Most of the copied Egyptian characters in either notebook were untranslated by Smith or his associates.

Some of the characters are translated to read "Katumin, Princess, daughter of On-i-tas King of Egypt, who began to reign in the year of the world 2962. Katumin was born in the 30th year of the reign of her father and died when she was 28 years old which was in the year 3020." The Egyptian Hieratic characters have been translated by modern Egyptologists to read "Recitation by the Osiris".

The name Onitas appears in other Kirtland Egyptian manuscripts, and Joseph Smith's mother would later state that the mummies were "King Onitus and his royal household."

=== Copies of Egyptian characters ===
Title	Dimensions	Description	Handwriting	Date Produced	MS #
Copies of Egyptian Characters-A	34 cm × 20 cm (13.4 in × 7.9 in)	Copies of hieratic characters from "Book of the Dead", and drawings of baboons and of a priest offering water.	unknown	Summer of 1835	8
Copies of Egyptian Characters-B	39 cm × 20 cm (15.4 in × 7.9 in)	Copies of hieratic characters from the "Book of the Dead"	Unknown. Numbering by early 20th century apostle James Talmage	Summer of 1835	9
Copies of Egyptian Characters-C	Irregular. 22 cm–32 cm × 8 cm–20 cm (8.7 in–12.6 in × 3.1 in–7.9 in)	Known as the "Church Historian's Fragment" or fragment IX, it contains pasted papyri and copied characters. Unlike other papyri, it has been in continuous possession by the LDS church	Unknown	Summer of 1835	10
Copy of Hypocephalus	26 cm × 23 cm (10.2 in × 9.1 in)	Copy of the hypocephalus of Sheshonq, with lacuna showing. The lacuna were later filled in and published as Facsimile 2 in the Book of Abraham.	Unknown	Between July 1835 and March 1842	

=== Egyptian alphabet documents ===
Title	Dimensions	Description	Handwriting	Date Produced	MS #
Egyptian Alphabet-A	1st leaf – 13 cm × 20 cm (5.1 in × 7.9 in); 2nd leaf – 32 cm × 40 cm (13 in × 16 in); 3rd leaf – 32 cm × 39 cm (13 in × 15 in); 4th leaf – 31 cm × 39 cm (12 in × 15 in)	The most complete of the three Egyptian alphabet documents.	Joseph Smith, with some small additions by Oliver Cowdery and William W. Phelps	Early July–November 1835	4
Egyptian Alphabet-B	1st leaf – 32 cm × 20 cm (12.6 in × 7.9 in); 2nd leaf – 32 cm × 39 cm (13 in × 15 in); 3rd leaf – 32 cm × 20 cm (12.6 in × 7.9 in); 4th leaf 23 cm × 20 cm (9.1 in × 7.9 in)	Along with Phelps version, column not present in Joseph Smith's version for an unknown purpose.	Oliver Cowdery	Early July–November 1835	5
Egyptian Alphabet-C	31 cm × 20 cm (12.2 in × 7.9 in)	Four leaves of paper, Phelps has labeled the additional column "lettr", but after two entries, abandons the column		Early July–November 1835	3
Egyptian Counting	31 cm × 20 cm (12.2 in × 7.9 in)	Two leaves of paper with a base 10 counting system. While titled, "Egyptian Counting," the characters are not Egyptian, and it is unknown where the characters originated from.	William W. Phelps	Early July–November 1835	2
Scrap	6 cm–9 cm × 20 cm (2.4 in–3.5 in × 7.9 in)	Small scrap of paper with the single word "Kolob"	Warren Parrish	July–November 1835	

The three Egyptian alphabet documents created by Joseph Smith and his associates are an attempt to systematize the Egyptian language. Much like a dictionary, there are columns with the character, pronunciation and the definition of the character. The documents are incomplete, with many of the characters lacking definitions.

Some of the characters do not come from the Papyri, but from what Joseph Smith told William W. Phelps were Adamic language characters.

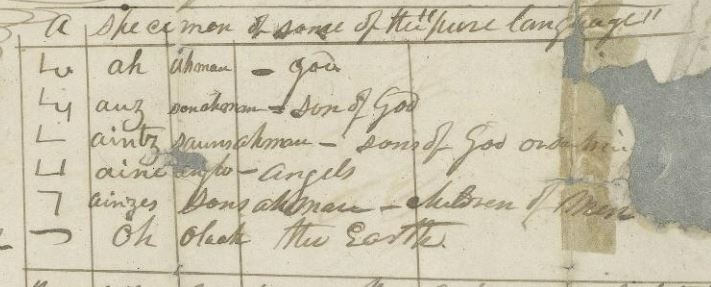
Sample of pure language, in a letter from William W. Phelps to his wife Sally on May 26, 1835, written one month prior to the arrival of the Papyri

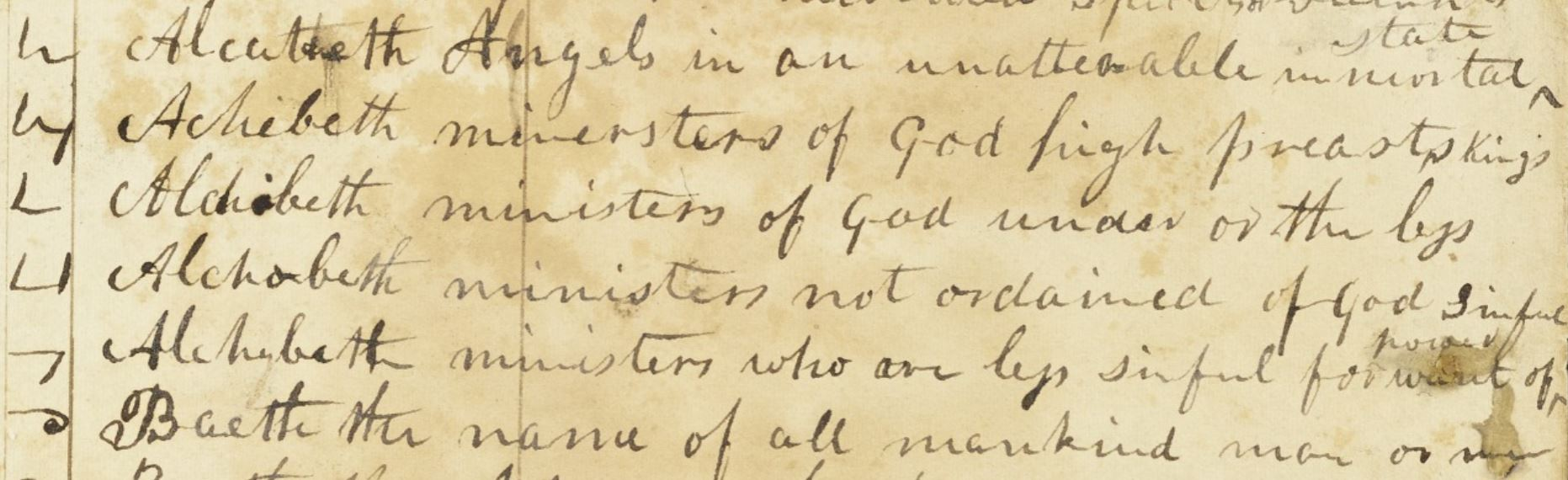
Section of Egyptian Alphabet-A in Joseph Smith's handwriting, with pure language characters

=== Grammar and alphabet of the Egyptian language ===
Title	Dimensions	Description	Handwriting	Date Produced	MS #
Grammar and Alphabet of the Egyptian Language	31 cm × 20 cm × 3 cm (12.2 in × 7.9 in × 1.2 in)	108 leaves, all but 36 are blank. A significant expansion of the alphabet documents, with descriptions of characters in all 5 degrees of translation.	William W. Phelps and Warren Parrish	July–November 1835	1

==== Authorship controversy ====
Egyptologist I. E. S. Edwards stated that the Egyptian Alphabet and Grammar was "largely a piece of imagination and lacking in any kind of scientific value." Hugh Nibley commented that the Grammar was "of no practical value whatever."

In 1968, Jay Todd suggested that the Grammar may have been reverse-engineered from an inspired Book of Abraham translation. In 1971, Hugh Nibley expanded on Todd's argument, explaining that the Alphabet and Grammar materials were largely an uninspired production of Joseph Smith's scribes, who had turned against him and were working independently of him at the time. This view is also accepted by John Gee. Samuel M. Brown has argued for a slightly more nuanced version of this view, attributing to W. W. Phelps a "major" role in authoring the Alphabet and Grammar, while at the same time conceding that the project was carried on under Smith's direction. Brown asserts that it is "unlikely, though not impossible, that the Grammar was actively used in producing the Book of Abraham."

In 1970, Richard P. Howard proposed the opposite view: that the Alphabet and Grammar was the modus operandi of the Book of Abraham's translation. Edward H. Ashment has also adopted this view, arguing against Nibley that the scribes of the KEP were all loyal to and in good standing with Joseph Smith at the time the manuscripts were produced. More recently, Christopher C. Smith has argued at some length that Joseph Smith was the primary author of the Alphabet and Grammar documents, and that those documents served as the source or modus operandi for the translation of at least the first three verses of the Book of Abraham. According to Christopher, "This undoubtedly accounts for the choppiness and redundancy of these three verses, which stylistically are very different from the remainder of the Book of Abraham. Verse 3, for example, reads as though it has been cobbled together from a series of dictionary entries."

=== Book of Abraham manuscripts circa July-circa November 1835 ===
Title	Dimensions	Description	Handwriting	Date Produced	Translation MS #
Book of Abraham Manuscript-A	1st leaf – 32 cm × 19 cm (12.6 in × 7.5 in); 2nd leaf – 32 cm × 20 cm (12.6 in × 7.9 in)	2 leaves of paper with writing on both sides, comprising Abraham 1:4–2:6	Frederick G. Williams	July–November 1835	2
Book of Abraham Manuscript-B	1st leaf – 32 cm × 19 cm (12.6 in × 7.5 in); 2nd leaf – 32 cm × 20 cm (12.6 in × 7.9 in); 3rd leaf – 32 cm × 20 cm (12.6 in × 7.9 in)	3 leaves of paper with writing on both sides, comprising Abraham 1:4–2:2	Warren Parrish	July–November 1835	3
Book of Abraham Manuscript-C	31 cm × 19 cm (12.2 in × 7.5 in)	The most complete manuscript with 5 leaves comprising Abraham 1:1–2:18.	William W. Phelps and Warren Parrish	July–November 1835	1
Book of Abraham Manuscript and Explanation of Facsimile I	29 cm × 19 cm (11.4 in × 7.5 in)	Written in Nauvoo, 13 leaves comprising Abraham 1:1–2:18.	Willard Richards	February 1842	
Explanation of Facsimile 2	20 cm × 25 cm (7.9 in × 9.8 in)	Contains the explanation Joseph Smith gave of the hypocephalus known as Facsimile 2. Text only, no accompanying drawing. "Some of the entries in this document borrow heavily from the Grammar and Alphabet Volume"	Willard Richards	15 March 1842	
Book of Abraham Manuscript	29 cm × 19 cm (11.4 in × 7.5 in)	1 leaf, 2 sides, containing Abraham 3:18–26 is the only extant portion of what was probably a larger manuscript.	Willard Richards	8–15 March 1842	

== Publication ==
The LDS Church has been accused of suppressing the Kirtland Egyptian Papers because they were considered potentially damaging to the credibility of Joseph Smith, Jr. as a prophet. The Papers have been in the Church Historian and Recorder's vault in Salt Lake City since 1855, and there are indications that the Church Historians have been aware of the documents' whereabouts since 1908. Their existence was denied until 1935, when James R. Clark and Sidney B. Sperry were informed that they were in the vault. Even then, Clark and Sperry were not permitted to inform the public about the discovery until some time thereafter. When the documents' existence was finally revealed, Clark stated that he did not believe the Alphabet and Grammar should be submitted to scholars. He preferred to "depend on our testimonies of the gospel."

Jerald and Sandra Tanner, critics of the Church, obtained an unauthorized copy of a microfilm strip containing images of the documents in 1966, and published them as Joseph Smith's Egyptian Alphabet & Grammar. This publication was criticized in a BYU Studies article by Hugh Nibley in 1971 because it did not contain all of the manuscripts, and included no critical apparatus to aid readers in distinguishing one manuscript from another. Nibley's article included images of ten of the manuscript pages. The Tanner publication was revised and updated by H. Michael Marquardt in 1981. Marquardt added a critical apparatus and some interpretive material. A new critical edition of the Book of Abraham manuscripts by Brian M. Hauglid appeared in 2011, with a second volume planned to publish the remainder of the KEP.

On October 29, 2018, the Joseph Smith Papers project released all existing documents relating to the creation of the Book of Abraham, including high resolution images of all the Egyptian Papyri, KEPs, and Nauvoo papers.

== See also ==
- Book of Abraham
- Criticism of the Book of Abraham
- Joseph Smith Hypocephalus
- Joseph Smith Papyri
- The Joseph Smith Papers
- Kolob
- Reformed Egyptian
