= Sokar =

Ancient Egyptian deity

- Sokar was depicted as a falcon-headed man wearing an Atef crown
Name in hieroglyphs
z k r P3or z k ror z k r A41orz k r G10
- Major cult center: Memphis

The syncretized god Sokar-Osiris. His iconography combines that of Osiris (atef-crown, crook and flail) and Sokar (hawk head, was-sceptre).

Sokar (/ˈsɛkər/; also spelled Seker, and in Greek, Sokaris or Socharis) is a hawk or falcon god of the Memphite necropolis in the Ancient Egyptian religion, who was known as a patron of the living, as well as a god of the resurrected dead. He is also in some accounts a solar deity as for The Temple of Sokar in Memphis.

== Name ==
Although the meaning of his name remains uncertain, the Egyptians in the Pyramid Texts linked his name to the anguished cry of Osiris to Isis 'Sy-k-ri' ('hurry to me'), or possibly skr, meaning "cleaning the mouth". In the underworld, Sokar is strongly linked with two other gods, Ptah the Creator god and chief god of Memphis, and Osiris the god of the dead. In later periods, this connection was expressed as the triple god Ptah-Sokar-Osiris.

The Faiyumic Coptic form ⲥⲓⲭⲟⲗ is possibly preserved in a personal name ⲥⲉⲛⲥⲓⲭⲟⲗ, "daughter of Sokar".

== Appearance ==
Painting of Sokar from the tomb of Seti I (KV17)

Sokar was usually depicted as a mummified hawk and sometimes as a mound from which the head of a hawk appears. Here he is called 'he who is on his sand'. Sometimes, he is shown on his hennu barque which was an elaborate sledge for negotiating the sandy necropolis. One of his titles was 'He of Restau' which means the place of 'openings' or tomb entrances. Like many other gods, he was often depicted with a Was-scepter

In the New Kingdom Book of the Underworld, the Amduat, he is shown standing on the back of a serpent between two spread wings; as an expression of freedom this suggests a connection with resurrection or perhaps a satisfactory transit of the underworld. Despite this, the region of the underworld associated with Sokar was seen as difficult, sandy terrain called the Imhet (also called Amhet, Ammahet, or Ammehet; meaning 'filled up').

== Roles and cults ==
Sokar, possibly through his association with Ptah, has a connection with artisans. In the Book of the Dead, he is said to fashion silver bowls and at Tanis a silver coffin of Sheshonq II has been discovered decorated with the iconography of Sokar.

Sokar's cult centre was in Memphis, and festivals in his honor were held there on the 26th day of the fourth month of the akhet (spring) season. While these festivals took place, devotees would hoe and till the ground, and drive cattle, which suggests that Sokar could have had agricultural aspects about him.

Sokar is mentioned in The Journey of Ra: the myth used to explain what happens during the night when Ra travels through the Underworld. According to the myth, Sokar rules the Fifth Kingdom of Night, which is called "Hidden", and is tasked with punishing the souls of evildoers by throwing them into a boiling lake.

As part of the festivals in akhet, his followers wore strings of onions around their necks, showing the Underworld aspect of him. Onions were used in embalming people - sometimes the skin, sometimes the entire onion. When just the skin was used, it would be placed on the eyes and inside the ears to mask the smell.

Also, the god was depicted as assisting in various tasks such as digging ditches and canals. From the New Kingdom a similar festival was held in Thebes, which rivaled the great Opet Festival.

Other events during the festival including floating a statue of the god on a Henu barque, which was a boat with a high prow shaped like an oryx.

== Popular culture ==
In the film The Ten Commandments (1956), the Pharaoh Rameses II invokes the same deity to bring his deceased firstborn son back to life, while wearing a dark blue robe with a silver bow.

In the show Stargate SG-1, the Goa'uld villain Sokar is named after him. Sokar appears as a powerful and sadistic Goa'uld who chose the role of the Devil rather than a god like the rest of his species. He is killed when the moon he uses as his own personal version of Hell is blown up, destroying Sokar's ship in orbit and Sokar himself.

American technical death metal band Nile wrote the title track of their album “Annihilation of the Wicked” about the domain, occupation, and appearance of Sokar. Curiously, the lyrics seem to describe Sokar in the form of Sokar-Osiris, not Ptah-Sokar-Osiris, deliberately excluding the aspects of Ptah. The lyrics call him "ancient and dead", a trait held by Osiris, but also describe him as being “shunned by Ra,” which would place the Sokar they describe in the context of Heliopolis rather than Memphis.

The fantasy role playing game "Advanced Dungeons and Dragons" includes Sokar in its 1st edition, "Deities and Demigods", and the "Legends and Lore" rulebooks. In this setting, Sokar is described as the Egyptian lesser god of light and, among other details, he casts rays of light from his hands which destroy all undead. His Alignment is given as Neutral Good, and it is noted he protects Egyptian souls of the same Alignment after their death. No specific mention is made of the later triple persona, though his symbol is given as a hawk-headed mummy holding an ankh, which does at least indirectly suggest the connection.

== Gallery ==
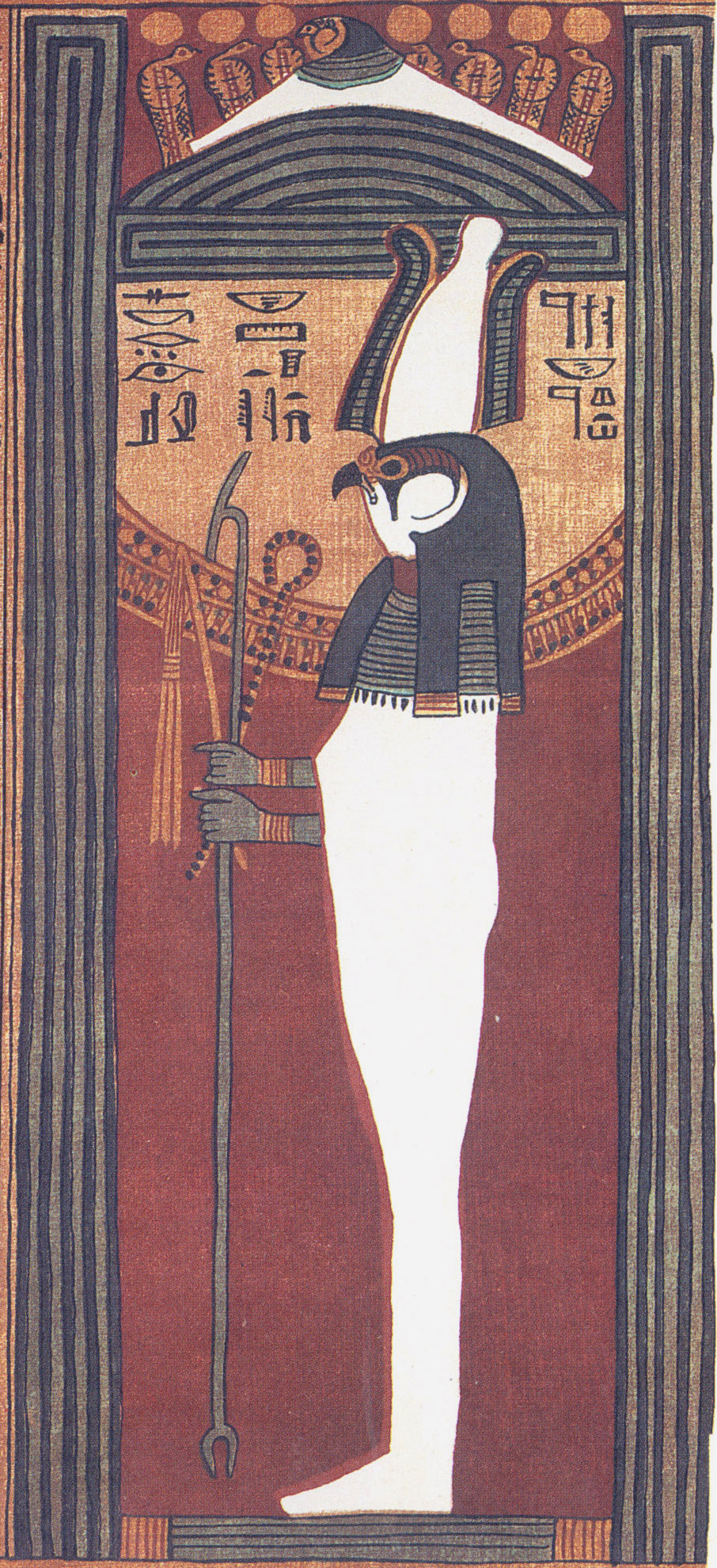
Facsimile of a vignette from the Papyrus of Ani, depicting Sokar-Osiris standing in a shrine.

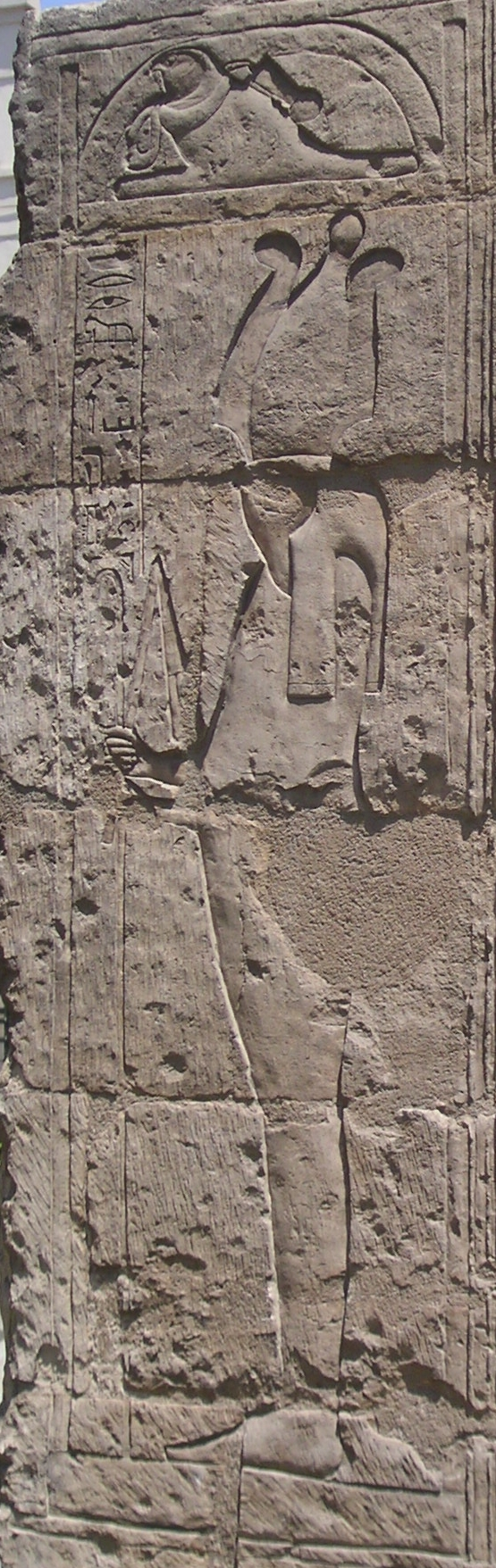
Relief depicting Sokar, Chapel of the High Priest of Ptah Sheshonq, twenty-second Dynasty, Cairo Museum

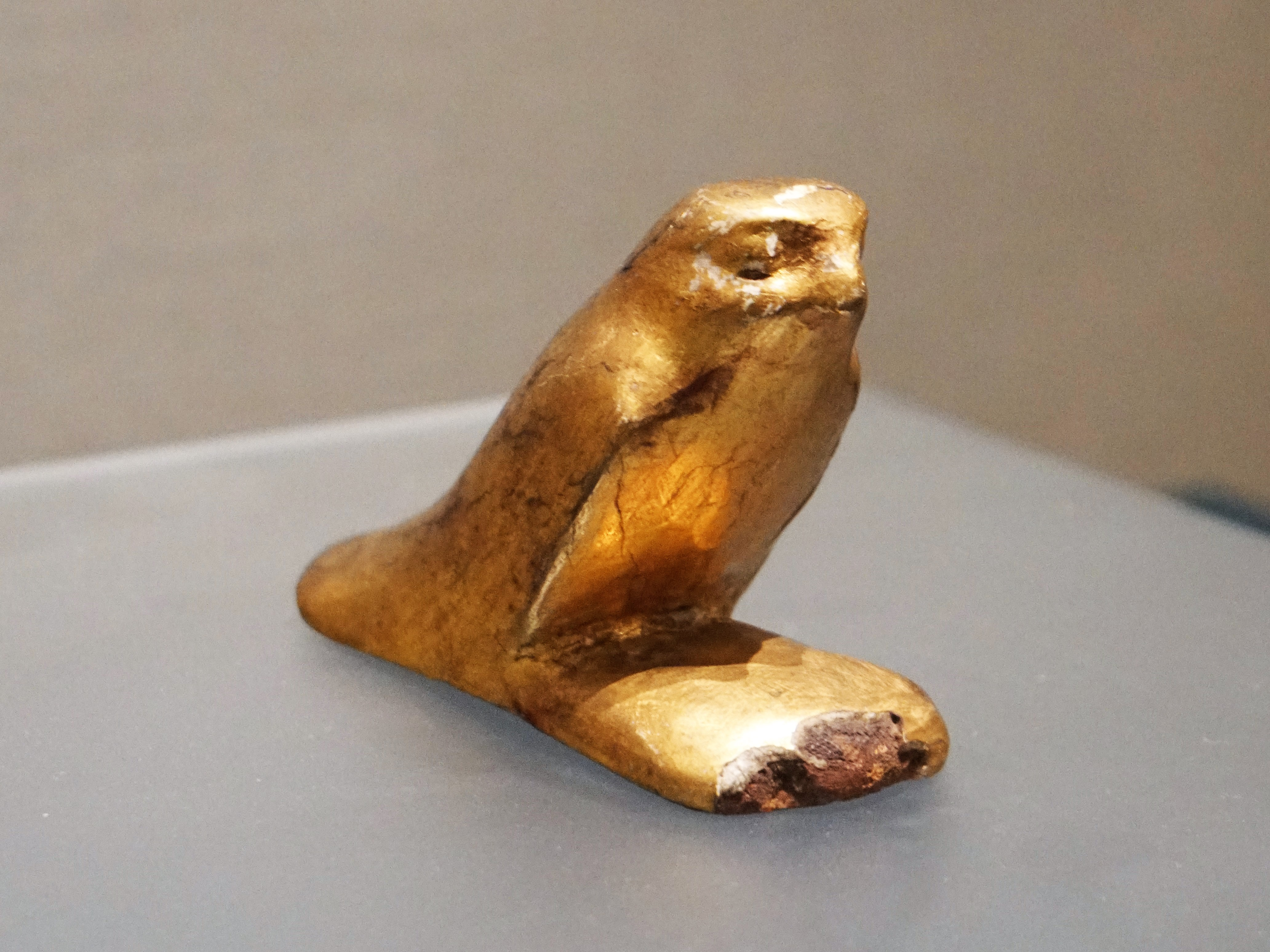
Gold statue of Sokar

Sokar with outstretched wings; scene from the Joseph Smith Hypocephalus

== See also ==
- Sokar (Stargate)

== Bibliography ==
- Graindorge, Catherine (1994). Le Dieu Sokar a Thebes Au Nouvel Empire (in French). Otto Harrassowitz Verlag. ISBN 3447034769.
- Mikhail, Louis B. (1984). "The Festival of Sokar: An Episode of the Osirian Khoiak Festival". Göttinger Miszellen 82.
