= Hypocephalus =

Ancient Egyptian small disk-shaped drawing

modern drawing of a typical Hypocephalus

A hypocephalus is a small disk-shaped object generally made of stuccoed linen, but also of papyrus, bronze, gold, wood, or clay, which ancient Egyptians from the Late Period onwards placed under the heads of their dead. The circle was believed to magically protect the deceased and cause the head and body to be enveloped in light and warmth, making the deceased divine. It replaced the earlier cow-amulet.

== Symbolism ==
Hypocephali symbolized the Eye of Ra (Eye of Horus), which represents the sun deity. The scenes portrayed on them relate to Egyptian ideas of resurrection and life after death, connecting them with the Osirian myth. To the ancient Egyptians the daily setting and rising of the sun was a symbol of death and rebirth. The hypocephalus represented all that the sun encircles — the world of the living, over which it passed during the day, was depicted in the upper half, and that of the dead, which it crossed during the night, in the lower portion.

Hypocephali first appeared during the Egyptian Saite Dynasty (663–525 B.C.) and their use continued for centuries. Chapter 162 of the Book of the Dead version of that period contain directions for the making and use of hypocephali.

== Preservation ==
Hypocephali are kept in museums in Europe (including several examples of the British Museum), the Middle East, and in the United States — three in the University of Pennsylvania Museum of Archaeology and Anthropology and one in the Boston Museum of Fine Arts. No two hypocephali are the same, and there are just over 100 known samples of them.

French egyptologist Brigitte Vallée has been working on these objects since 1995. She has compiled a corpus of approximately one hundred and sixty specimens, all different. She has classified, deciphered, compared, and analyzed them. (sources : Brigitte Vallée, Catalogue Raisonné des hypocéphales de l’Égypte Ancienne, Comprehensive Annotated Catalogue of Hypocephali Figures from Ancient Egypt).

== Gallery of Hypocephali ==
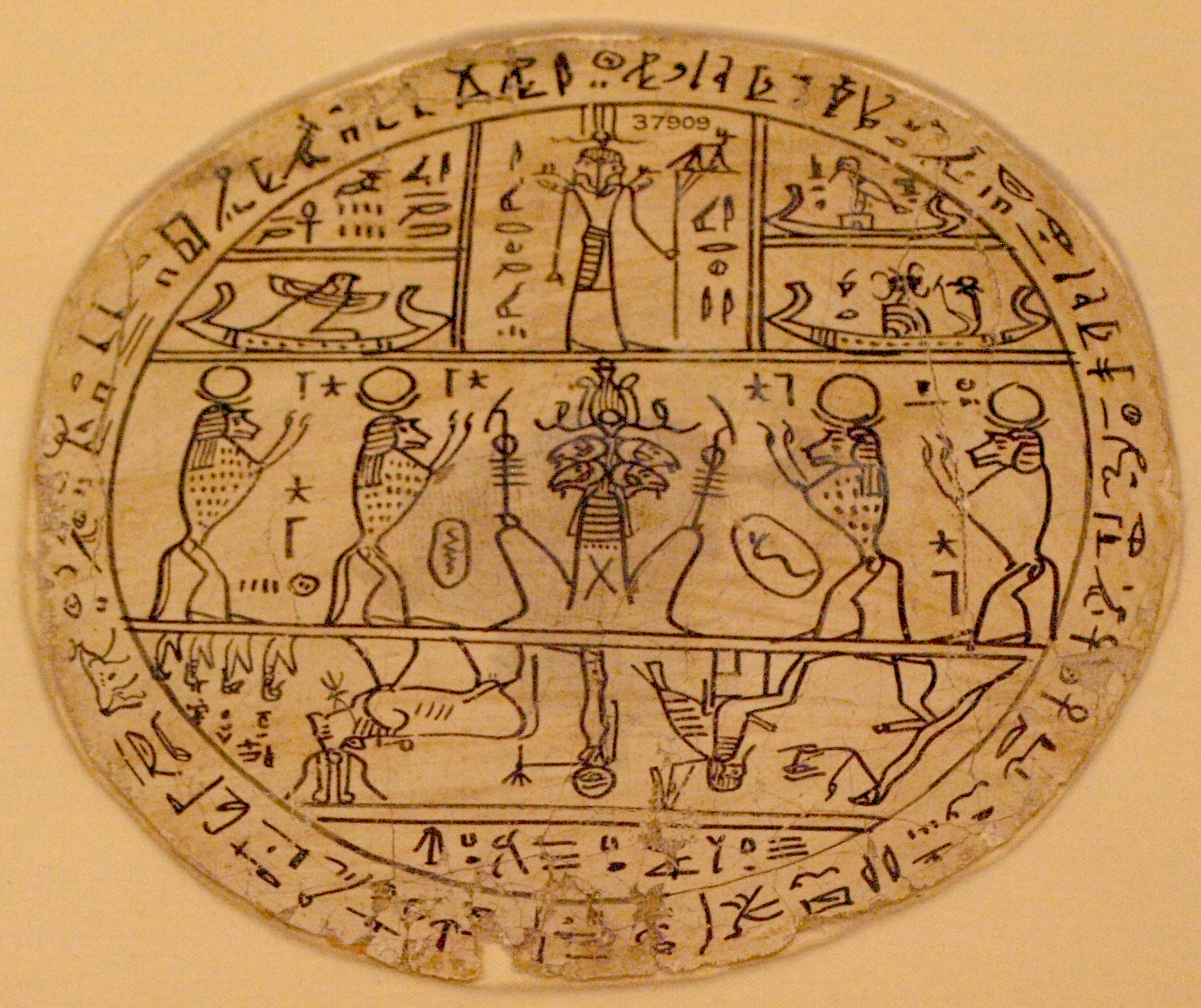
Hypocephalus of Tasheritkhons inscribed with Chapter 162 of the Book of the Dead, on display at the British Museum

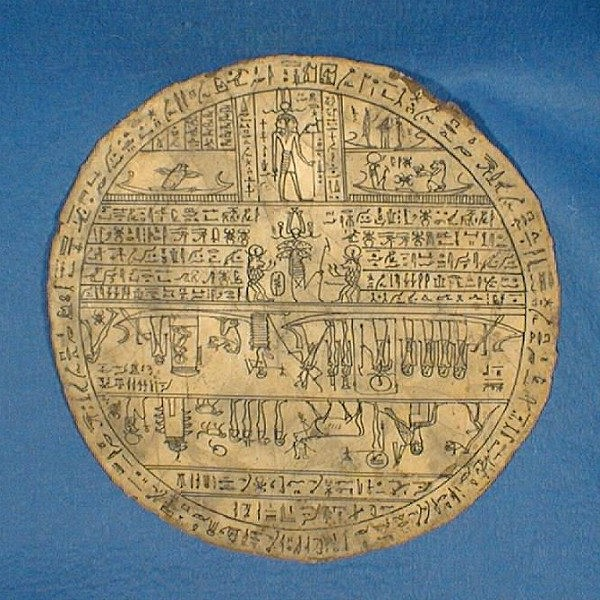
Ptolemaic era. Unknown origin. Located at Royal Museums of Art and History in Brussels

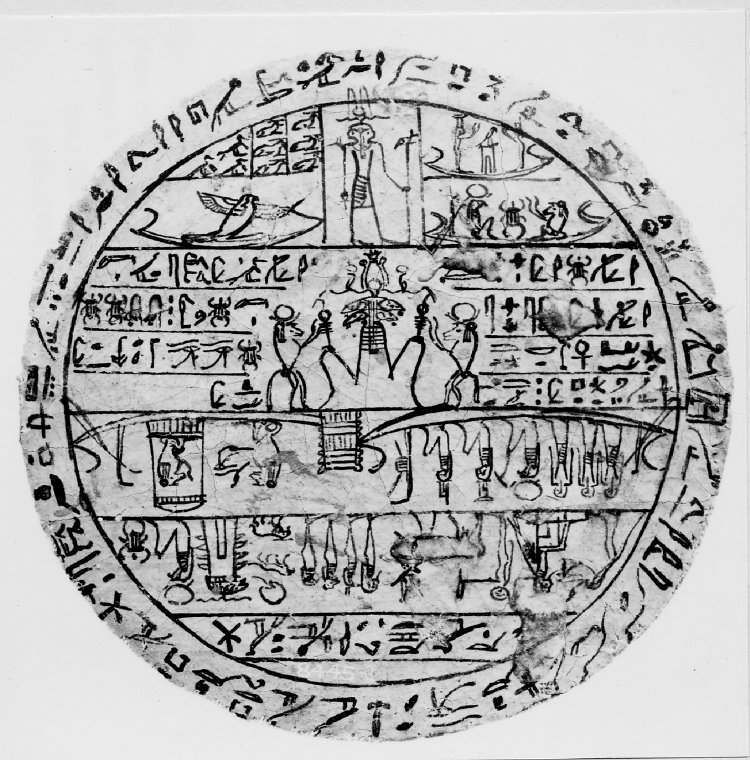
Ptolemaic Era. Located at British Museum.

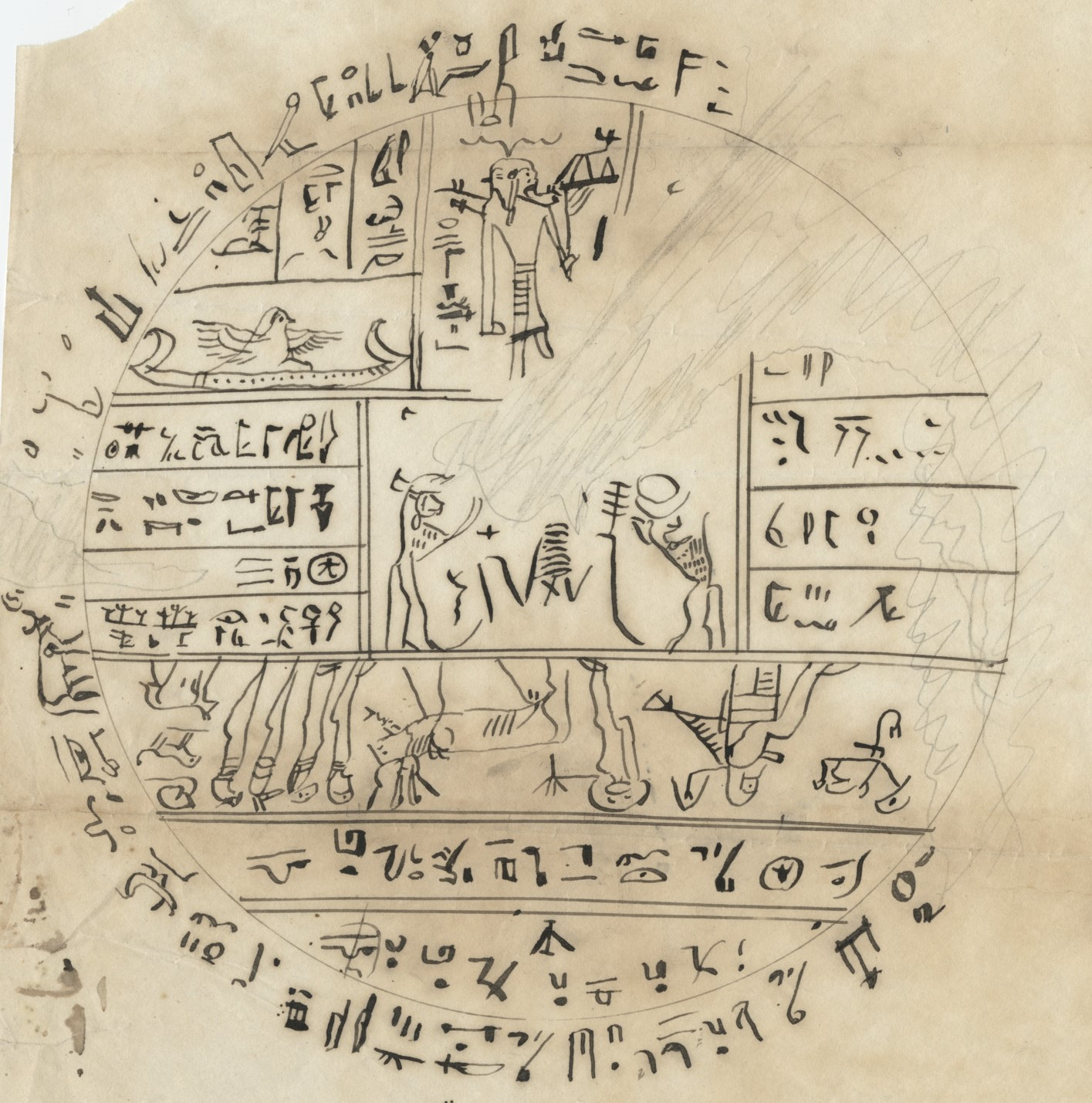
Facsimile of no longer extant Ptolemaic Era Hypocephalus of Sheshonq, see Joseph Smith Hypocephalus.

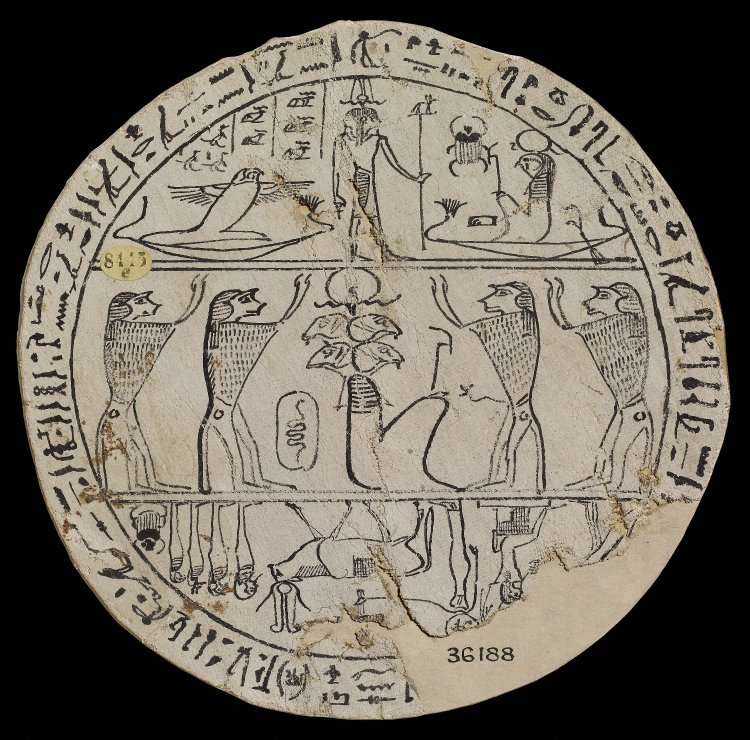
Hypocephalus of Neshorpakhered found at the British Museum. 4thC BC-3rdC BC.

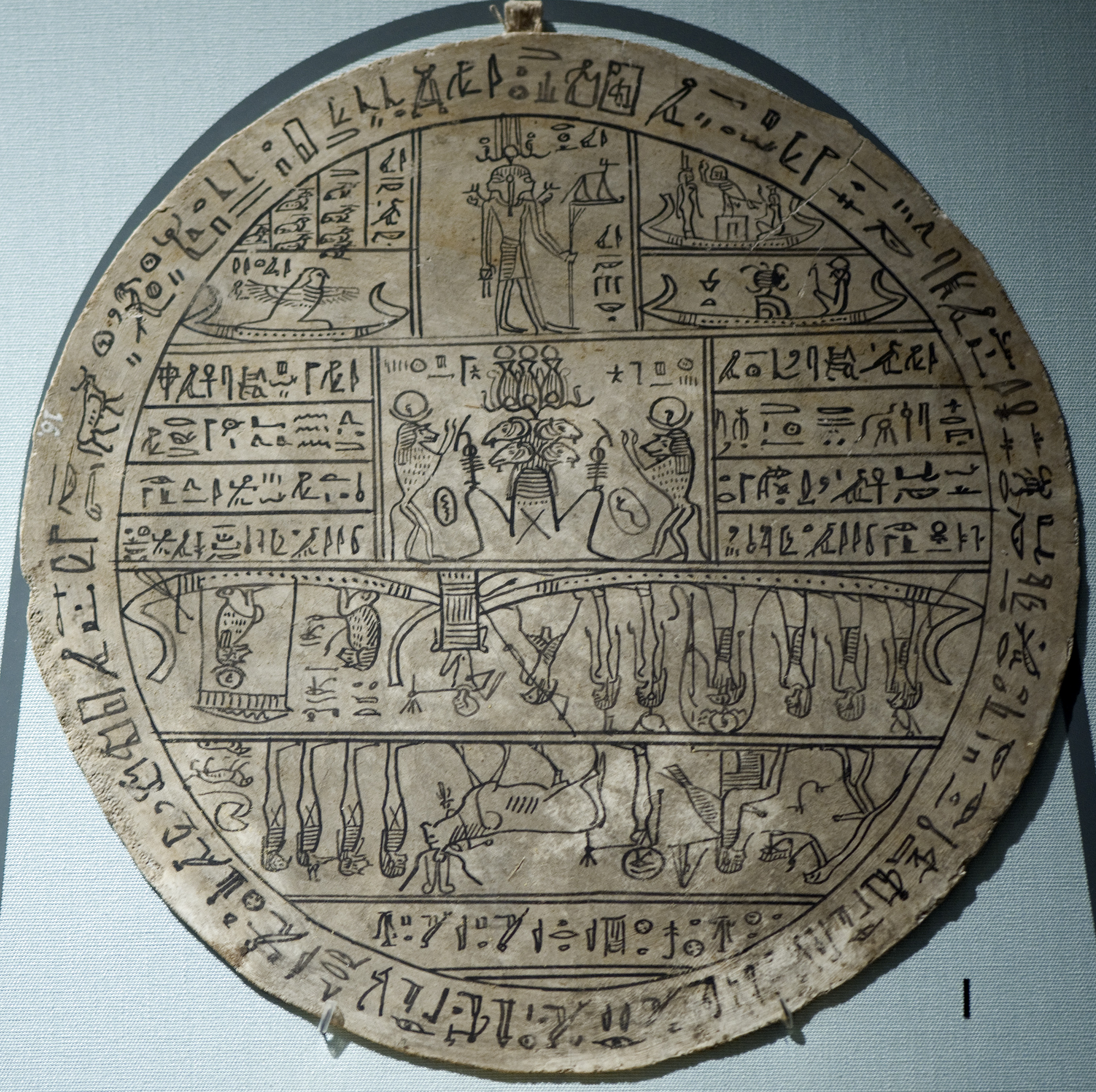
Circa 300 BC, located at Rijksmuseum van Oudheden (RMO), Leiden.

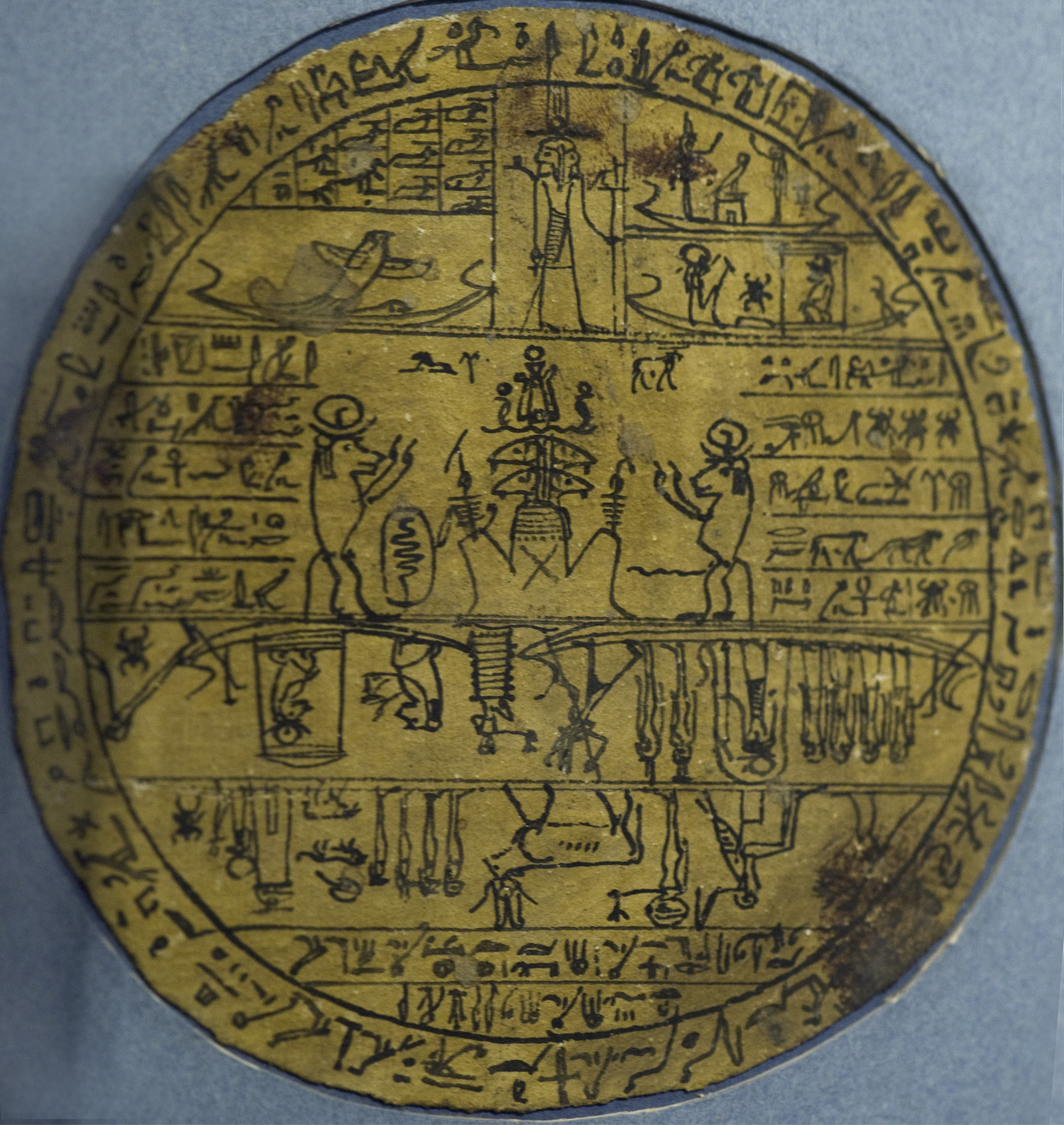
Circa 300 BC, located at the Louvre, photographed when on loan to RMO.

== See also ==
- Brigitte Vallée
