= Gabriel Devéria =

French diplomat and interpreter (1844–1899)

Jean-Gabriel Devéria
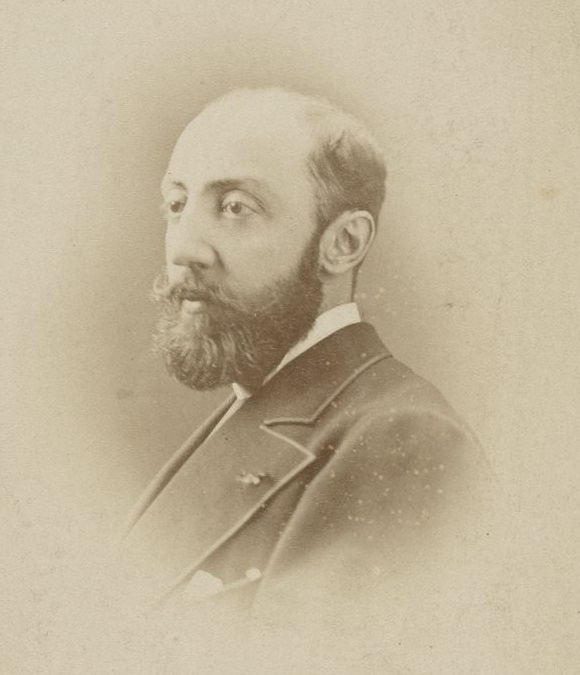
- Portrait of Gabriel Devéria, July 1886
- Born: 8 March 1844; Paris, France
- Died: 12 July 1899 (aged 55); Mont-Dore, France
- Citizenship: France

Jean-Gabriel Devéria (8 March 1844 – 12 July 1899), known as Gabriel Devéria, was a French diplomat and interpreter who worked for the French diplomatic service in China from the age of sixteen. He was also a noted sinologist and pioneer Tangutologist who published one of the first studies of the Tangut script in 1898.

== Biography ==
Devéria was born in Paris on 8 March 1844 to a family of artists. His father was Achille Devéria (1800–1857), a renowned painter and lithographer, and his uncle was the Romantic painter Eugène Devéria (1805–1865). His mother Céleste, who married his father in 1829, was the daughter of a lithographic printer, Charles-Etienne Motte (1785–1836). He was one of six children, including Théodule Devéria (1831–1871), who became a photographer and Egyptologist. After the death of his father in 1857, when he was only thirteen years old, his older brother Théodule took responsibility for his education.

In February 1860, aged only sixteen, Gabriel Devéria was recruited as a student-interpreter in Chinese for a new School of Interpreters that the French government wanted to set up in China. In September of the same year he embarked on a ship bound for Tianjin in China, and arrived in China towards the end of the Second Opium War, when the United Kingdom and the French Empire had joined together in an attempt to force the Qing government to open up to trade with Europeans.

Devéria studied his trade at the French Consulate in Tianjin for several years, and between 1863 and 1869 he acted as an interpreter for the negotiation of treaties between China and Spain and Italy. In February 1870 he was promoted to the position of Chancellor at the French mission in Fuzhou.

Following the Tianjin Massacre in 1870, a Chinese mission of apology set sail to France, under Imperial Commissioner Chonghou, and Devéria was appointed to accompany the embassy as an interpreter. This was his first trip back to France, and when he arrived in Marseille he found his way to Paris impeded by the Franco-Prussian War. After the war ended on 28 January 1871, Devéria managed to reach to Paris, only to find that his brother Théodule had died a few days earlier.

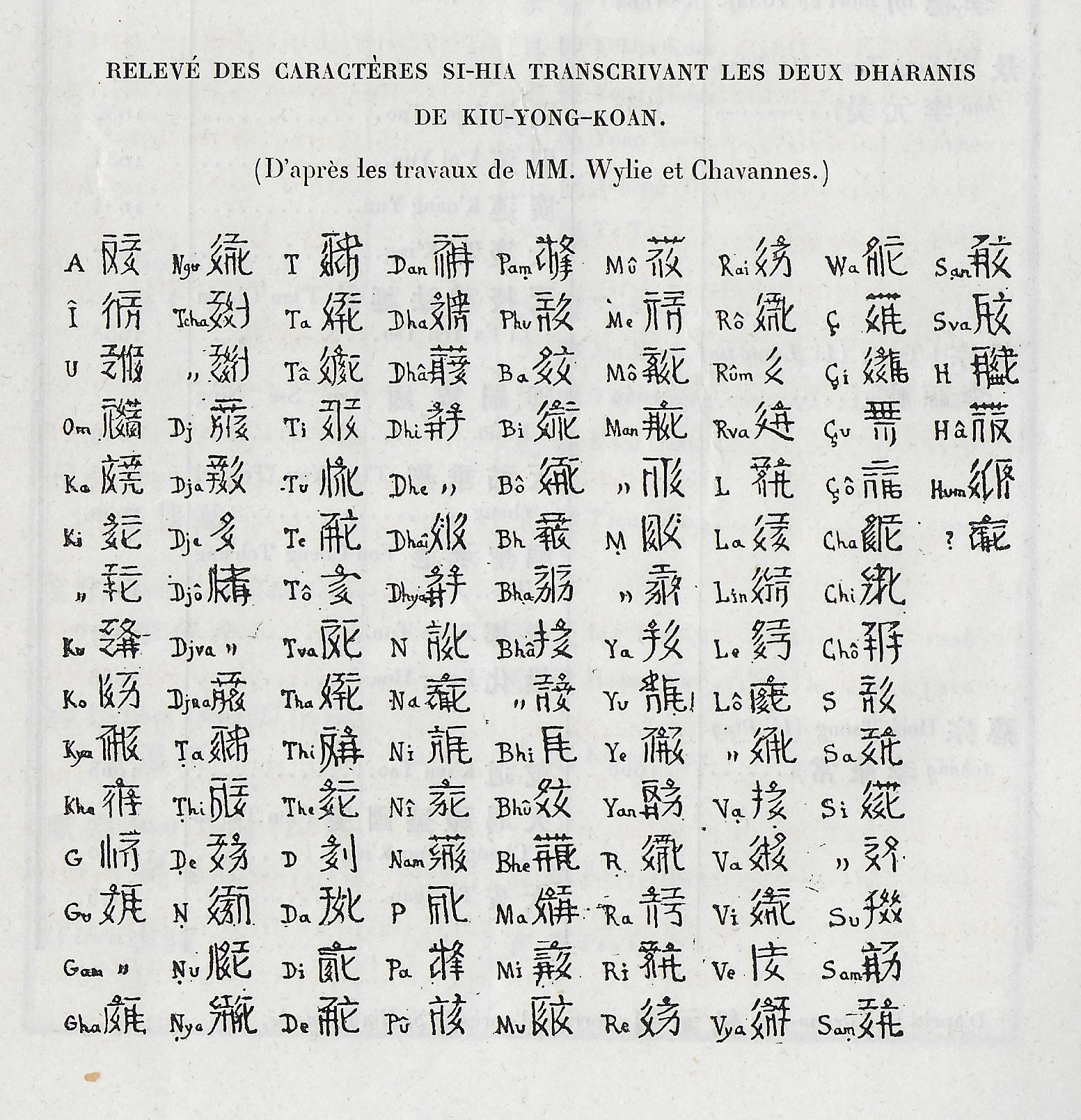
Table of Tangut characters with reconstructed phonetic readings published by Devéria in 1898

When Devéria returned to Paris in 1873, he was appointed First Interpreter to the French Legation in Beijing. Under the pseudonym T. Choutzé (朱茨), he published his first book in 1876, an account of his travels in the north of China (Pékin et le nord de la Chine). During the following years he concentrated on the study of Annam, publishing a geographic and ethnographic description of Annam in 1886, and an account of the relations between China and Annam two years later.

In 1876 Devéria married Charlotte Thomas, niece of the French composer Ambroise Thomas, who was an accomplished pianist and composer. She also wrote a series of articles about music in China, published in Magasin Pittoresque in 1885. She died in the same year, leaving a son born in 1892.

Later in his career, Devéria turned his attention to the study of the languages and epigraphic inscriptions left behind by the Jurchens and Tanguts. He made rubbings of the polyglot inscriptions at the Cloud Platform at Juyong Pass, which he provided to Prince Roland Napoléon Bonaparte who published them in his Documents de l'époque Mongole des XIII et XIV siècles (1895). In 1896 he published a history of the Bureau of Interpreters (會同館) which had been founded in the 15th century to enable communication between the Ming dynasty government and embassies and missions to China.

During the latter half of the 1890s Devéria became interested in the spread of foreign religions in China and the Far East, such as Islam and Manichaeism.

Devéria's final works were two pioneering studies of the Tangut script, mainly based on the bilingual Chinese-Tangut inscription on a stele at the Huguo Temple (護國寺) in Wuwei, Gansu.

In the winter of 1898 he suffered a severe bout of Pleurisy, and the following summer he went to the resort of Mont-Dore to try to restore his health at the thermal springs, but on 12 July 1899 he suffered a hemorrhage and died.

== Diplomatic career ==
Devéria was promoted to Interpreter 1st Class in 1880, Consul 2nd Class in 1880, Secretary 2nd Class in 1881, Secretary Interpreter in 1882, Secretary 1st Class in 1883, and finally Consul General in 1888.

== Academic career ==
In 1889 Devéria was named Professor of Chinese at the School of Living Oriental Languages (École des Langues orientales vivantes) in Paris.

== Honours ==
In 1876 Devéria was made a Chevalier of the Légion d'honneur, and twenty years later, in 1896, he was promoted to Officier.

In 1888 he was awarded the Prix Stanislas Julien for his book La frontière sino-annamite.

In 1896 he was elected to the Académie des Inscriptions et Belles-Lettres, in place of Edmond Le Blant.

== Works ==
- 1898. Musulmans et Manichéens Chinois. Paris: Imprimerie Nationale.
- 1898. L'Écriture du Royaume de Si-Hia ou Tangout. Paris: C. Klincksieck.
- 1898. 'Stèle Si-hia de Leang-tcheou'; Journal Asiatique 9th series vol. 11 No. 1 (January–February 1898): 53–74.
- 1896. "Histoire du Collège des Interprètes de Pékin"; Melanges Charles de Harlez. Leyde: E. J. Brill.
- 1886. La frontière sino-annamite : description géographique et ethnographique d'après des documents officiels chinois. Paris: Leroux.
- 1880. Histoire des Relations de la China avec l'Annam-Viêtnam du XVIe au XIXe Siècle. Paris: Leroux.
- 1876. 'Pékin et le nord de la Chine'; Le Tour du Monde vol. 31 (pp. 305–368) and vol. 32 (pp. 193–256).
