= Théodule Devéria =

French archaeologist (1831–1871)

Théodule Charles Devéria
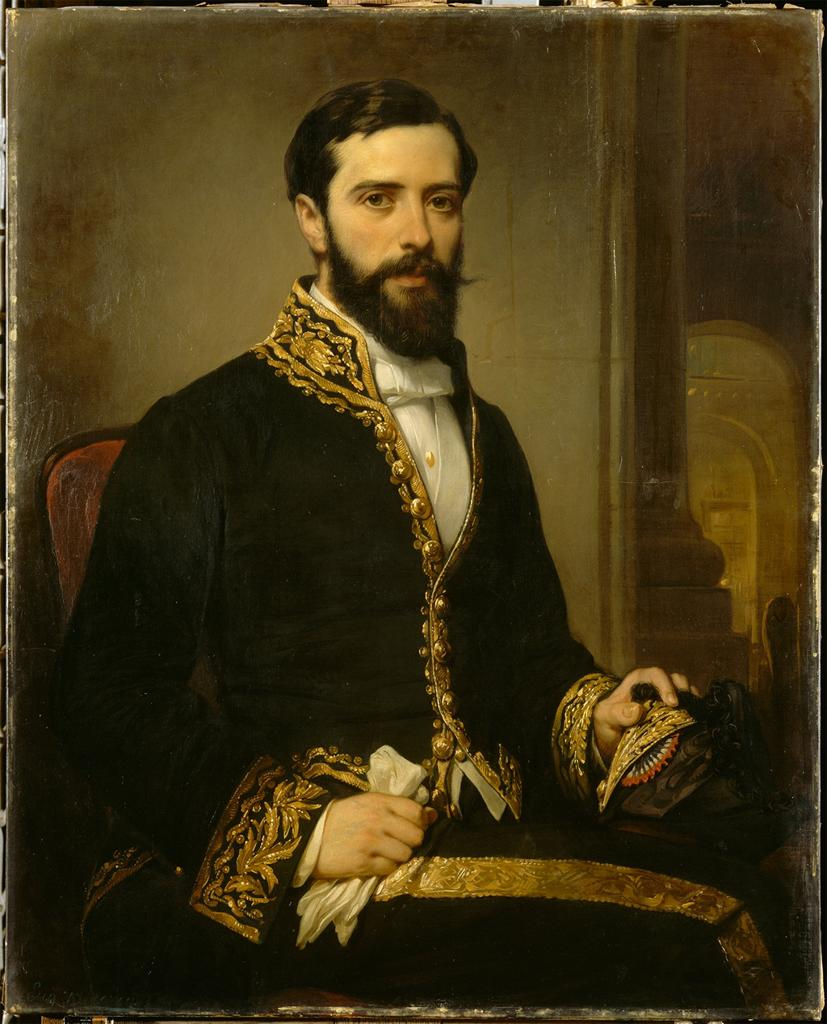
- 1864 portrait of Théodule by Eugène Devéria
- Born: 1 July 1831; Paris
- Died: 25 January 1871 (aged 39); Paris
- Occupation: Egyptologist
- Parent(s): Achille Devéria; Céleste Motte

Théodule Charles Devéria (French: [teodyl dəveʁja]; 1 July 1831 – 25 January 1871) was a French photographer and Egyptologist who lived in the 19th century. He is known for his collaboration with Auguste Mariette. His younger brother was Gabriel Devéria.

== Life ==
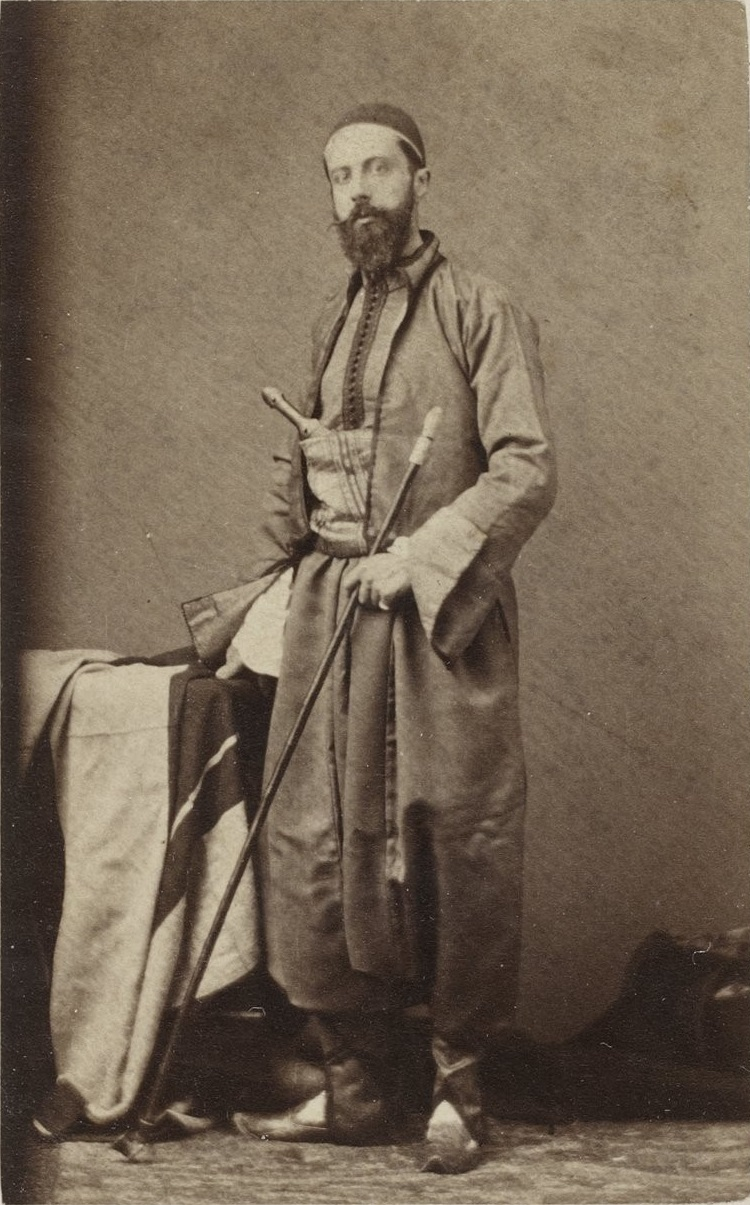
Photograph of Théodule Deveria

Théodule Charles Devéria was born in Paris on 1 July 1831, son of the painter Achille Devéria. In 1843 he met the Egyptologist Émile Prisse d'Avennes, who instilled in him an interest in the subject that was confirmed during a visit to the Leiden museum in 1846. He studied Coptic and Arabic, and attended the Collège de France where he was taught by Étienne Marc Quatremère. He entered the Cabinet of Prints in 1851, where his father was the preserving assistant, and where he learned photography.

In 1855 Devéria created lithographs for publication from a set of negatives of photographs made in Egypt of excavations in Thebes. That year he joined the Louvre's Department of Egyptian Antiquities with the task of cataloging the many objects that Auguste Mariette had discovered during his excavations and sent to France. In 1856 he illustrated Mariette's Choix de monuments et de dessins découverts ou exécutés pendant le déblaiement du Sérapéum de Memphis.

In December 1858 Devéria left for Egypt to help Mariette read inscriptions in Cairo and its surroundings. He tried to accurately document the archaeological sites using drawings, stampings and photographs. His calotype pictures from this trip are often poor in quality, showing a lack of technical skills. In 1860 he was appointed preserving assistant at the Louvre's Department of Egyptology. He revisited Egypt in 1861–62, traveling up the Nile to Philae at the First Cataract, and into Nubia to the Abu Simbel temples. After returning he helped Mariette prepare descriptions of the excavation in Egypt in 1850–54 for publication.

In November 1864 Devéria met the future oriental scholar Arthur Rhoné (1836–1910). A month later Devéria, Rhoné and some friends sailed to Egypt, where they visited Alexandria, Cairo, Memphis, and saw the work on the Suez Canal by Ferdinand de Lesseps. Devéria made drawings and took photographs that were reproduced in an album of 77 plates. The party went on to the Holy Land, Damascus and Istanbul. Devéria made a fourth and last visit to Egypt in 1865-66, traveling with Mariette. In 1868 he was made a knight of the Legion of Honor.

== Death and legacy ==
Devéria died in Paris on 25 January 1871:

Gravely ill with a chest condition, he had only been able to sustain himself for several years by spending the winter in Cannes. But when, in September 1870, he saw Paris threatened with siege, he cared less for the dangers than the archaeological treasures entrusted to his care. He firmly refused to leave, despite his poor state of health. On the evening of January 10, amid intense cold, he was forced to leave his apartment on the Left Bank, which had become unsafe due to German shelling. A few days later, he was dead.

The renowned Sir E. A. Wallis Budge noted of him, "No other scholar had such a wide and competent knowledge of the Book of the Dead", and that his death was a "great loss" to Egyptology.

== Criticism of the Book of Abraham facsimiles ==
Among his contributions was the first critical assessment of the interpretation made by Joseph Smith of Egyptian vignettes that appear in the Mormon scripture the Book of Abraham. His comments appeared in several publications, including the book The Rocky Mountain Saints: A Full and Complete History of the Mormons.

== Sources ==
- Bajac, Quentin (2013-12-16). "Deveria, Achilles (1800-1857) and Théodule (1831-1871)". In John Hannavy (ed.). Encyclopedia of Nineteenth-Century Photography. Routledge. ISBN 978-1-135-87327-1.
- Budge, E. A. Wallis (2003-06-01). From Fetish to God in Ancient Egypt. Kessinger Publishing. ISBN 978-0-7661-6285-3.
- Volait, Mercedes (2006). "Arthur-Ali Rhoné (1836-1910) – Du Caire ancien au Vieux-Paris ou le patrimoine au prisme de l'érudition dilettante". Socio-anthropologie (in French). 19.
