= The Reading of Mary Stuart's Sentence =

Painting by Eugène Devéria

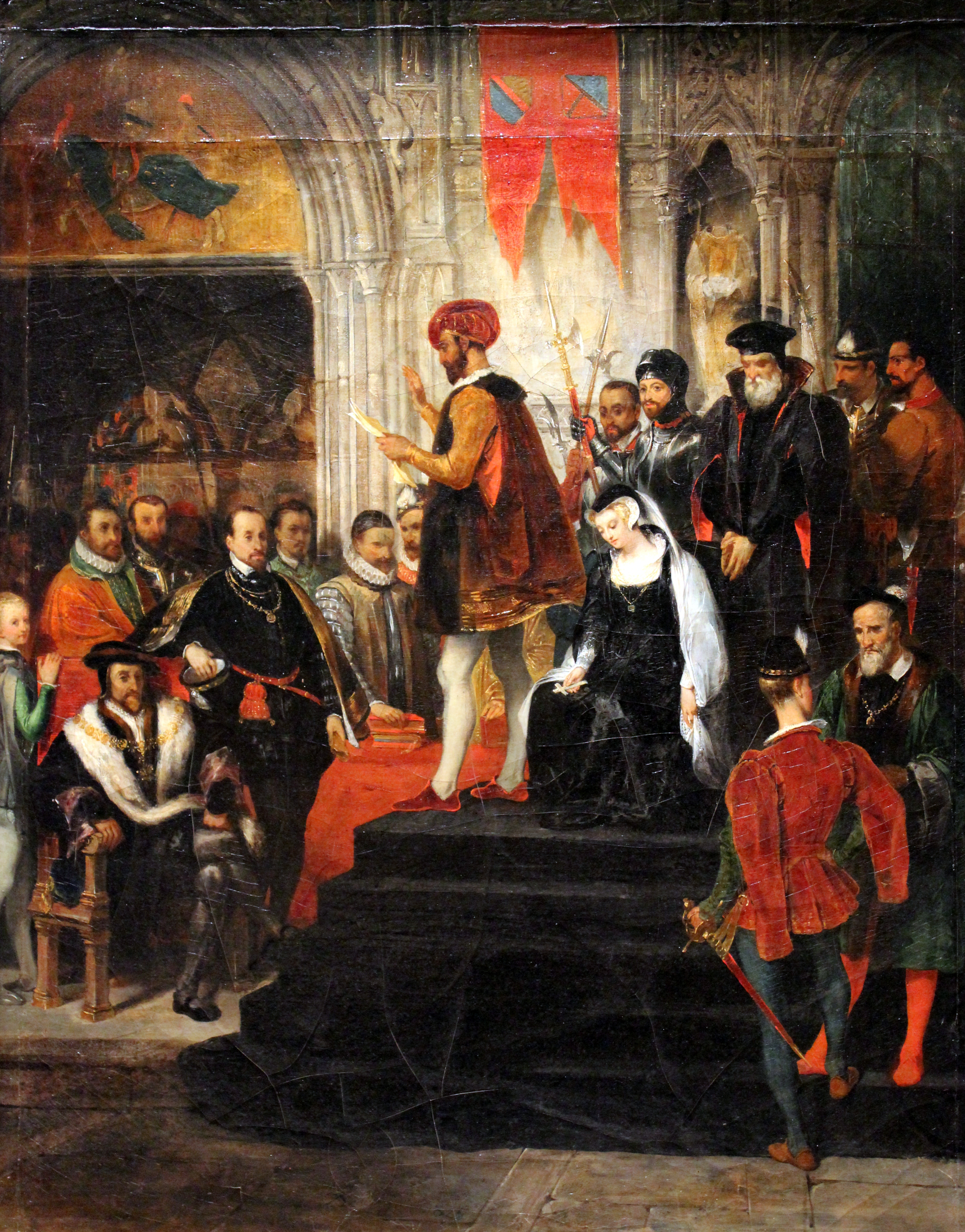
- Artist: Eugène Devéria
- Year: 1826
- Type: Oil on canvas, history painting
- Dimensions: 90 cm × 70 cm (35 in × 28 in)
- Location: Musée des Beaux-Arts; Angers

The Reading of Mary Stuart's Sentence (French: La Lecture de la sentence de Marie Stuart) is an oil on canvas history painting by the French artist Eugène Devéria, from 1826.

It portrays the reading of the death sentence of Mary, Queen of Scots after she was condemned for her part in the Babington Plot to overthrow her cousin Elizabeth I. It depicts the interior of Fotheringhay Castle in Northamptonshire where Mary was held as prisoner. It drew inspiration from Friedrich Schiller's tragedy Mary Stuart.

Depictions of British history were a common theme of the Romantic movement. The painting was exhibited at the Salon of 1827 at the Louvre. Today it is in the collection of the Musée des Beaux-Arts, in Angers.

== See also ==
- Mary Stuart Proclaiming Her Innocence, an 1832 painting by Francesco Hayez

== Bibliography ==
- Notter, Annick. Marie Stuart, une figure romantique: la destinée artistique de la reine d'Écosse au XIXe siècle. Mairie de La Rochelle, 2009.
- Schaefer, Carol. Mary Queen of Scots. Crossroad Publishing, 2002.
