= Achille Devéria =

French painter (1800–1857)

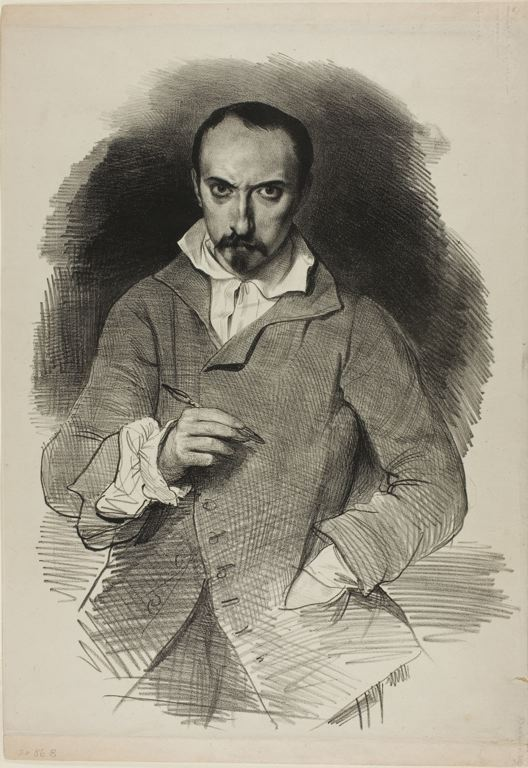
- Achille Devéria self-portrait, c. 1835.
- Born: Achille Jacques-Jean-Marie Devéria; 6 February 1800; Paris, France
- Died: 23 December 1857 (aged 57); Paris, France
- Occupation: Painter

Achille Jacques-Jean-Marie Devéria (6 February 1800 – 23 December 1857) was a French painter and lithographer known for his portraits of famous writers and artists. His younger brother was the Romantic painter Eugène Devéria, and two of his six children were Théodule Devéria and Gabriel Devéria.

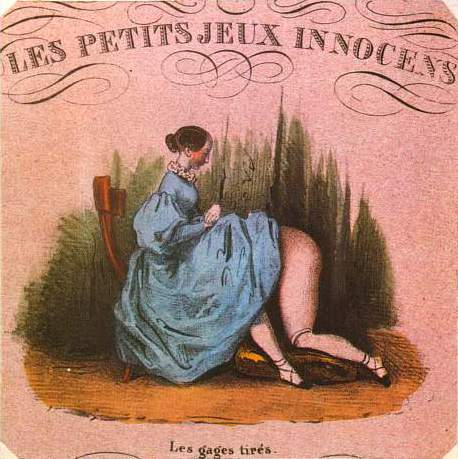
Les petits jeux innocens'Les gages tirés

== Early life ==
His father was a civil employee of the navy. Devéria became a student of Anne-Louis Girodet-Trioson and Louis Lafitte. In 1822, he began exhibiting at the Paris Salon. At some point, he opened an art school together with his brother Eugène, who was also a painter.

== Artistic works ==
By 1830 Devéria had become a successful illustrator and had published many lithographs in the form of notebooks and albums (e.g., his illustrations to Goethe's Faust, 1828) and romantic novels. He also produced many engravings of libertine contents.

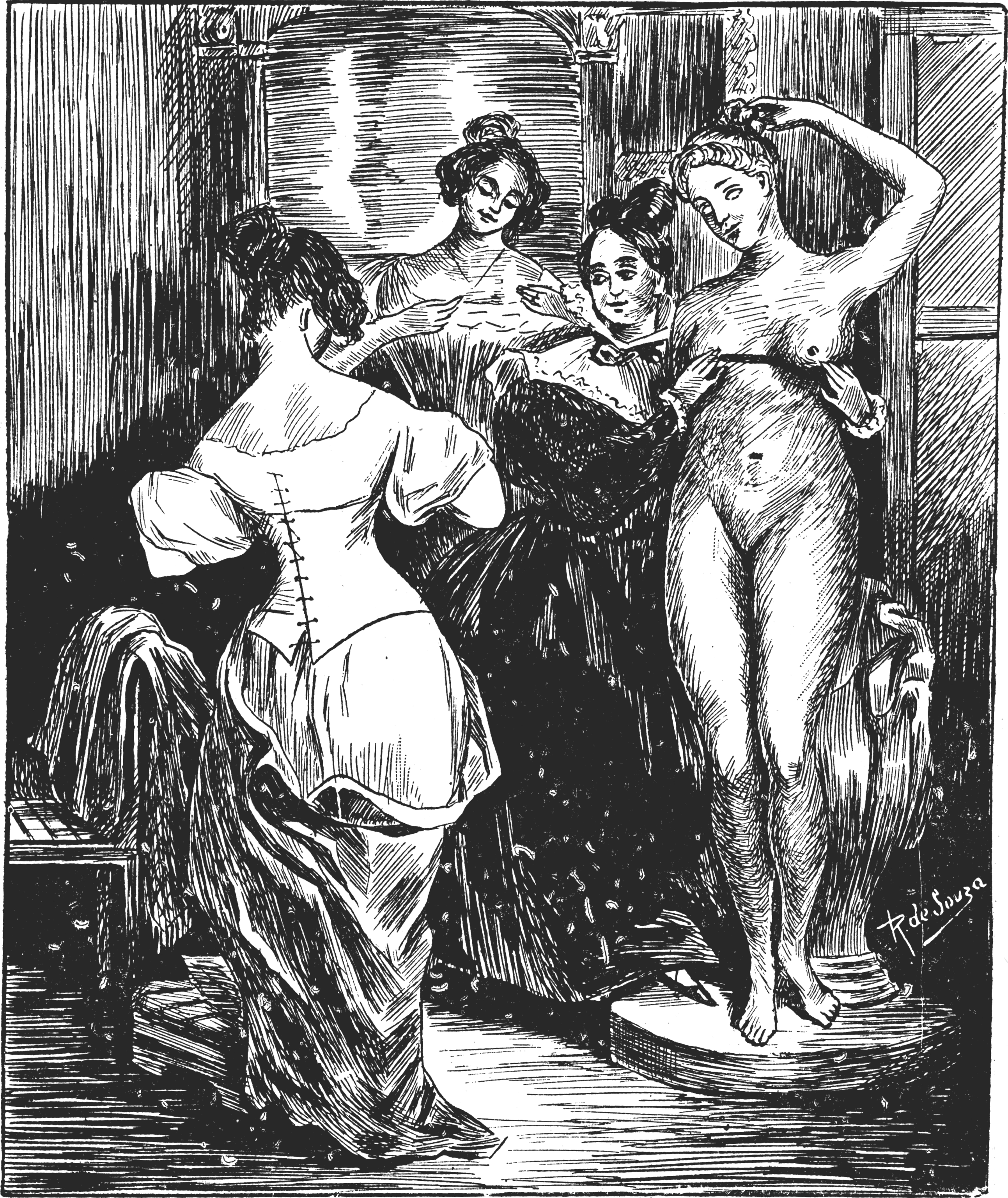
Fig. 107. Flatterie de corsetière. — C'est juste la taille de la Venus ! (Deveria).

=== Style ===
Devéria's experience in the art of the vignette and Mezzotint influenced his numerous lithographs, most of which were issued by his father-in-law, Charles-Etienne Motte (1785–1836). Most of his work consisted of "pseudo-historical, pious, sentimental or erotic scenes". (Wright) Since he rarely depicted tragic or grave themes, he appears less Romantic than many other artists of the time.

His paintings were mainly done using watercolours. The French poet and critic Charles Baudelaire referred to his portrait series as showing "all the morals and aesthetics of the age".

=== Subjects ===
Devéria was also known for doing portraits of artists and writers, whom he entertained in his Paris studio on Rue de l'Ouest. The list of his sitters includes Alexandre Dumas, Prosper Mérimée, Sir Walter Scott, Jacques-Louis David, Alfred de Musset, Charles Augustin Sainte-Beuve, Honoré de Balzac, Théodore Géricault, Victor Hugo, Marie Dorval, Alphonse de Lamartine, Alfred de Vigny, Jane Stirling, and Franz Liszt.

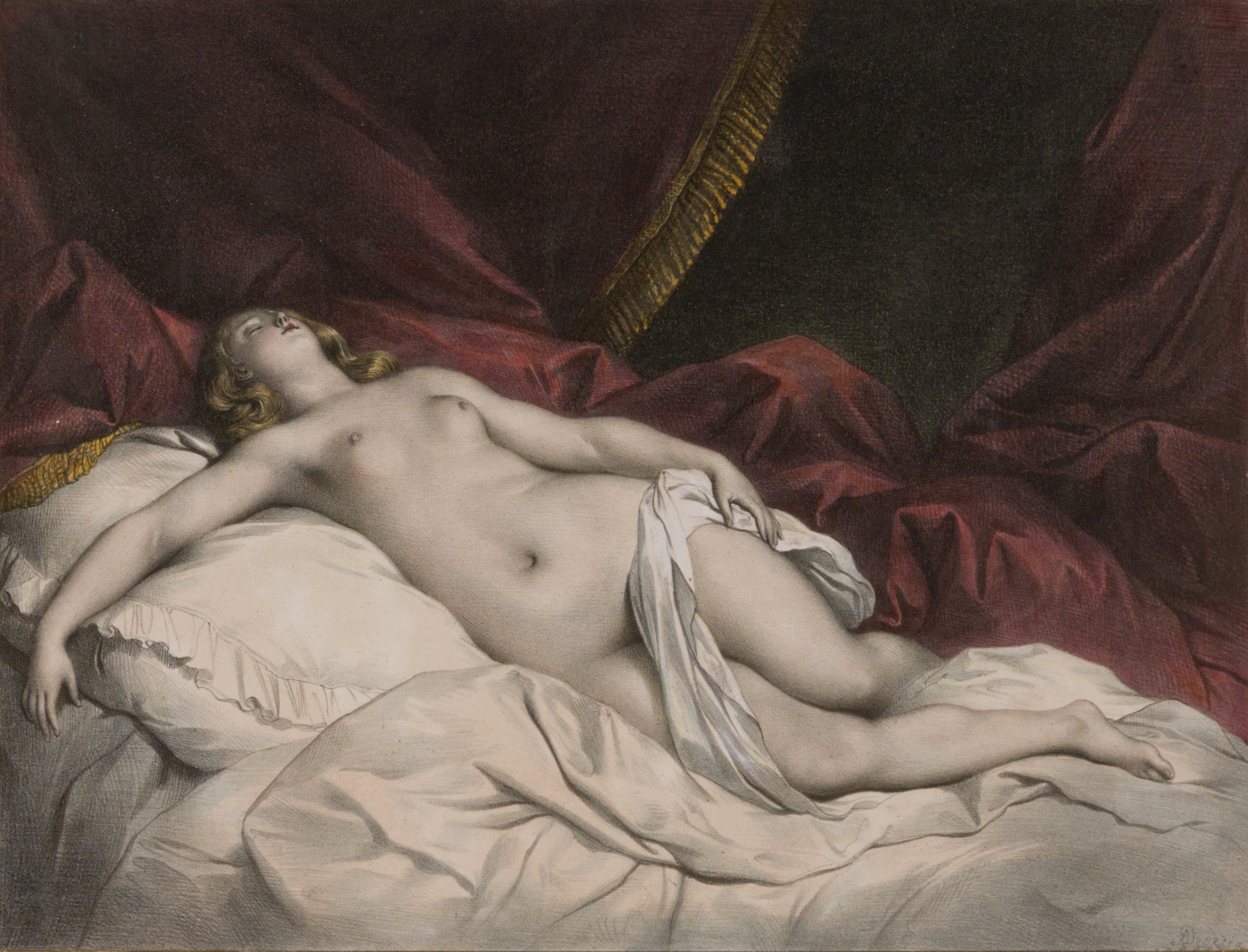
Tartu Art Museum

== Late life ==
In 1849 Devéria was appointed director of the Bibliothèque Nationale's department of engravings and assistant curator of the Louvre's Egyptian department. In the following years, he taught drawing and lithography to his son, Théodule Devéria, and both worked on a family portrait album from 1853 until his death. They applied ink wash to several of the portraits in the album, possibly in preparation for printing lithographs from the photographs. The album photographs by Théodule Devéria are dated 1854.

Devéria spent his last days traveling in Egypt, making drawings and transcribing texts. He died in 1857.

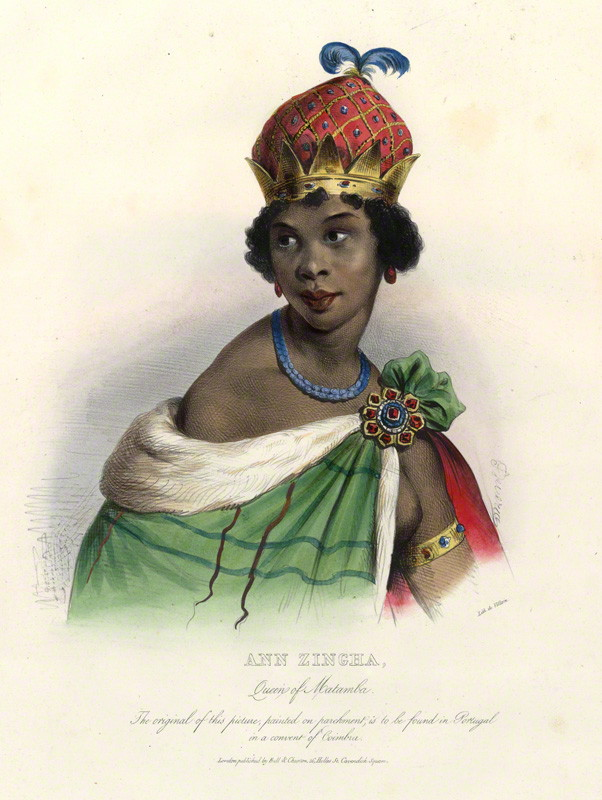
Hand colored lithograph of the woman known as 'Queen Ginga' in Portugal. Her name was Nzinga Mbande, although her name when converting to Christianity was 'Ana de Sousa'. Drawing from the collection of the National Portrait Gallery in London.

== Legacy ==
Works by Devéria are in the Louvre Museum, the Fine Arts Museums of San Francisco, the J. Paul Getty Museum, the Norton Simon Museum, and the Université de Liège collections.

== Gallery ==
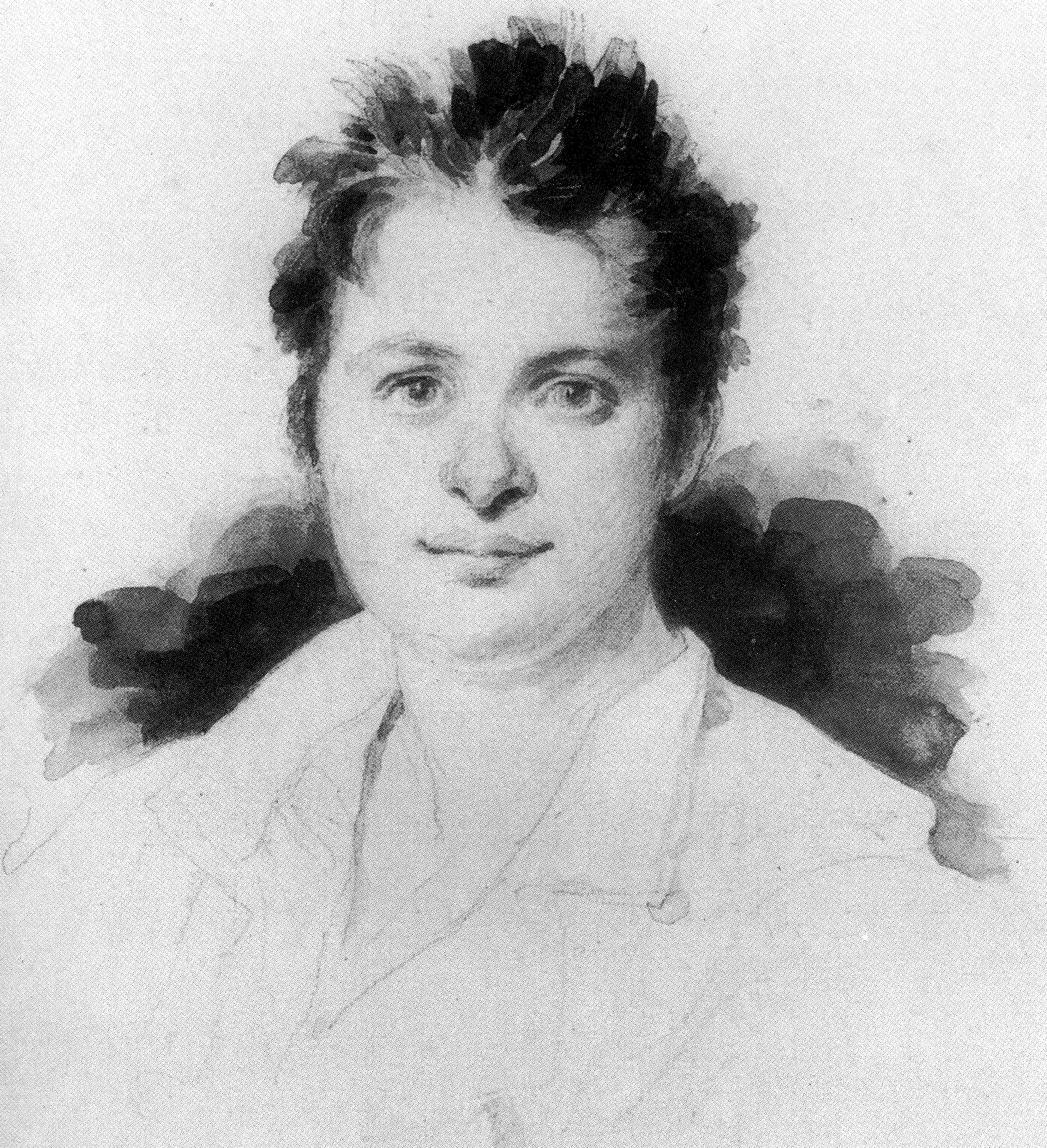
Honoré de Balzac, c. 1820

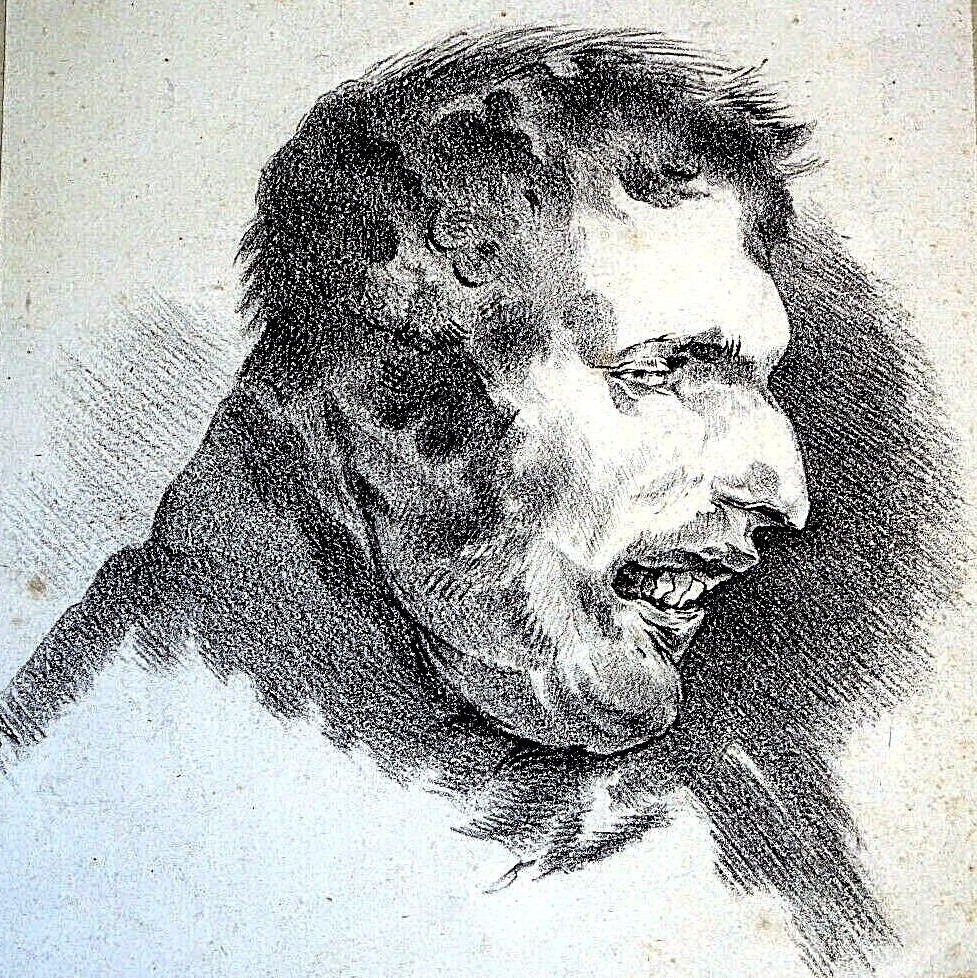
Une caricature de N.T. Charlet (d'après Théodore Géricault), vers 1825

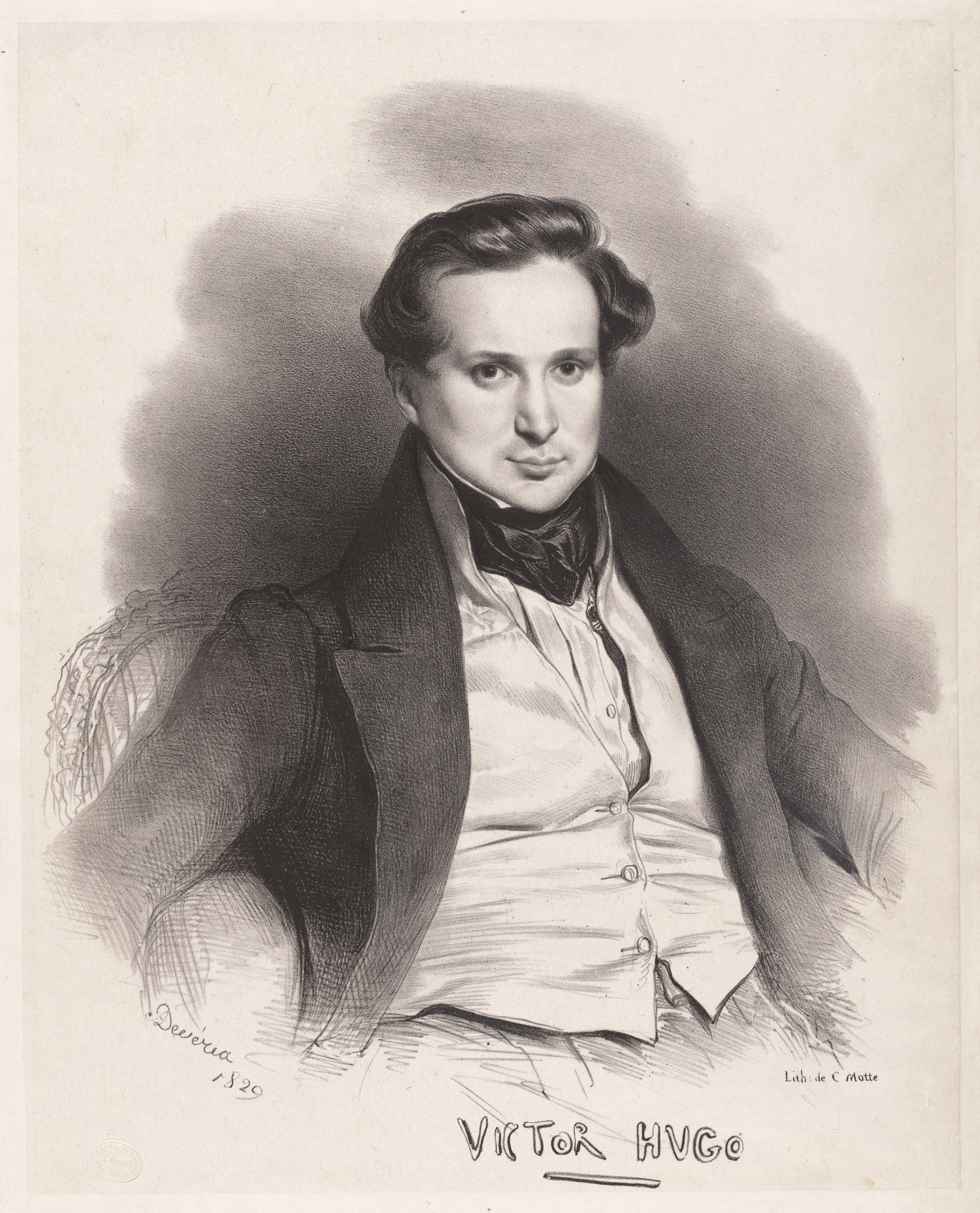
Victor Hugo in 1829, lithograph in the collection of the National Gallery of Art

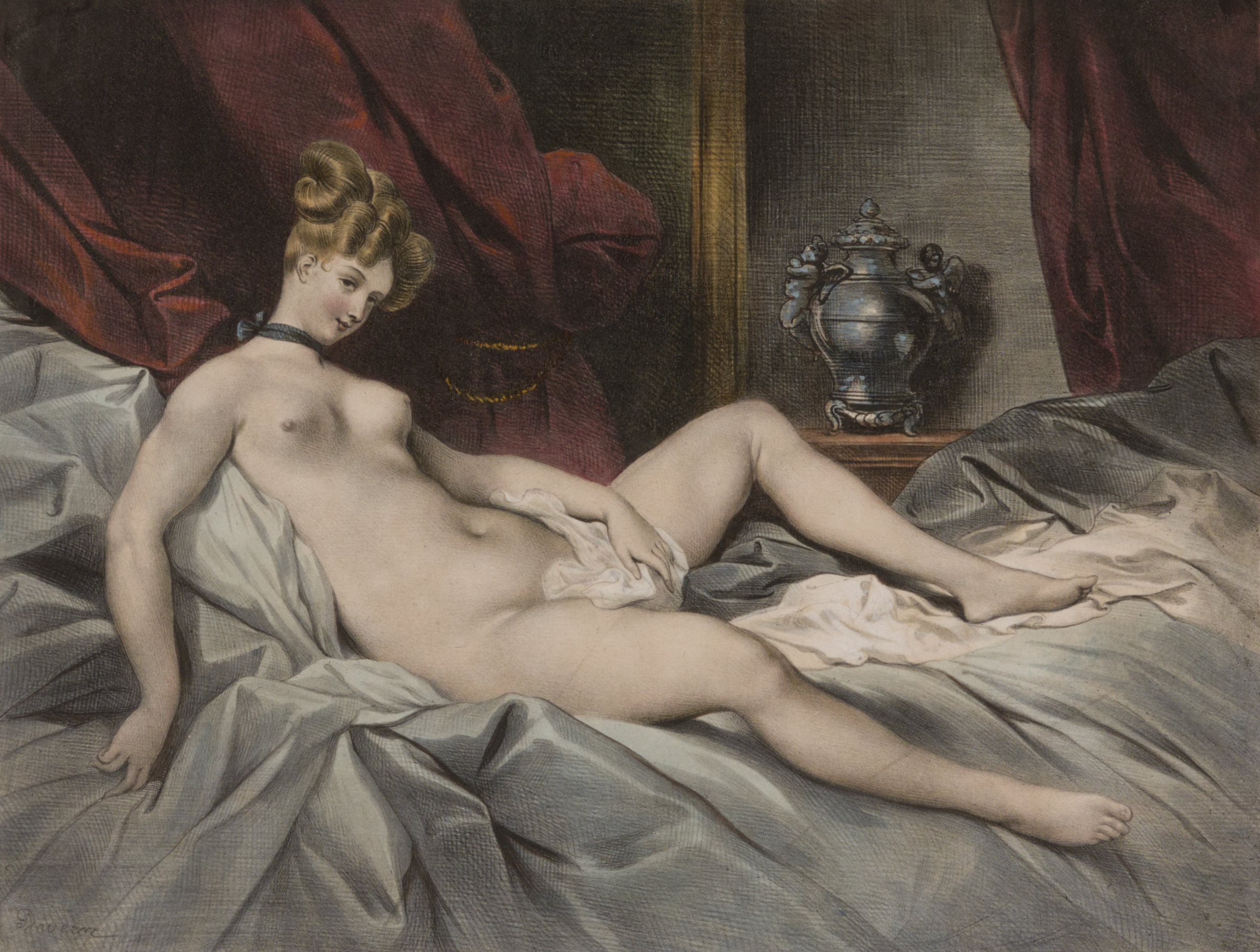
"Lying nude with a jug" Lamav akt kannuga

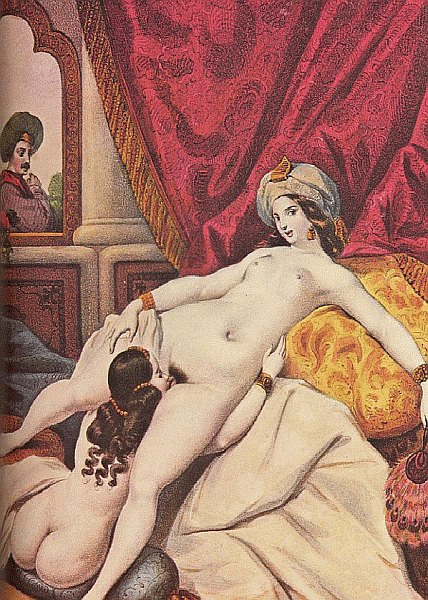
An Orientalist depiction of cunnilingus

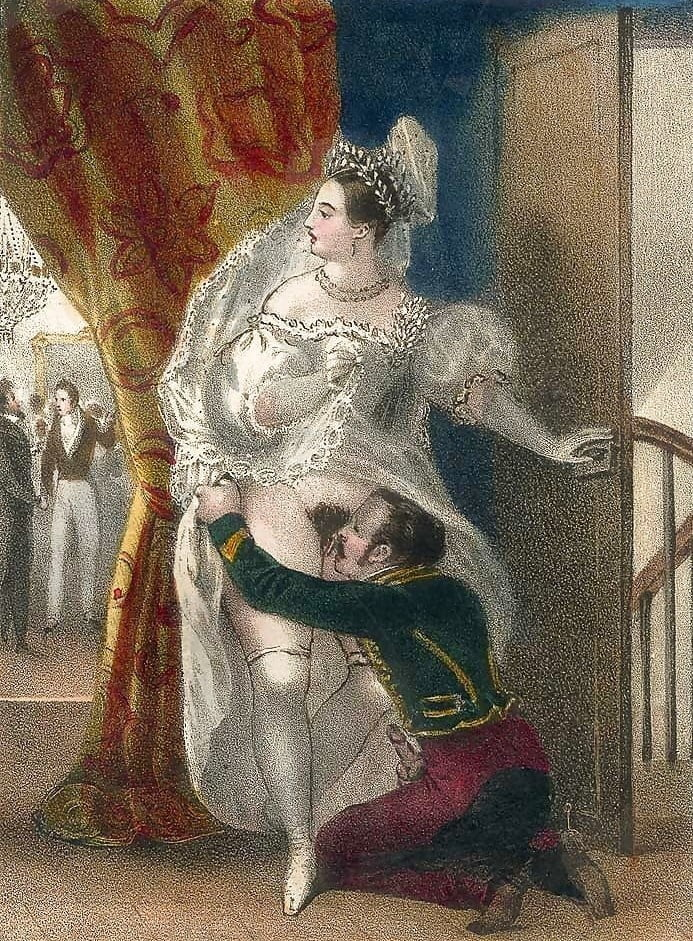
A libertine watercolor (after, or attributed to Achille Devéria)

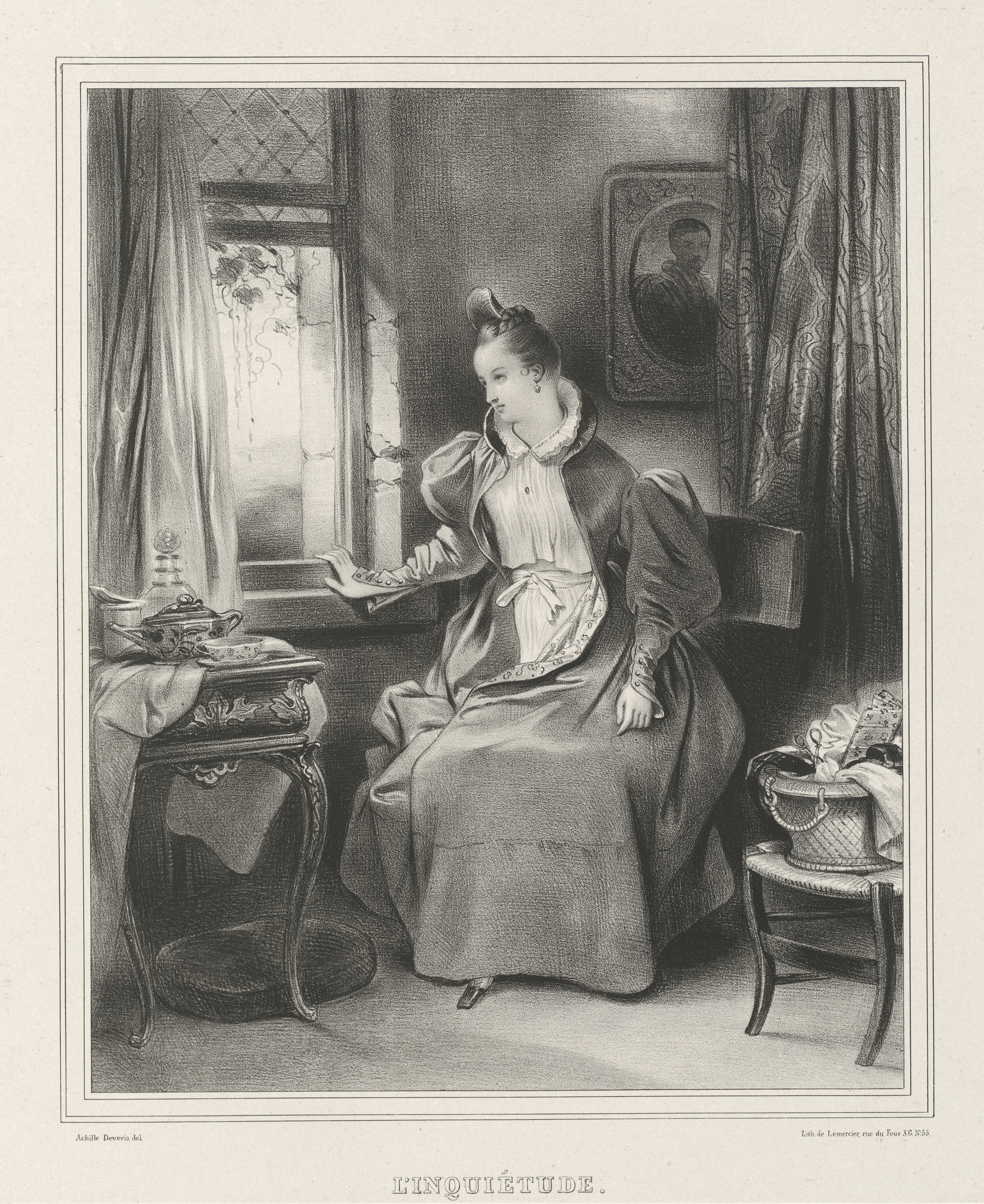
L'Inquietude (1829), lithograph from the collection of the National Gallery of Art

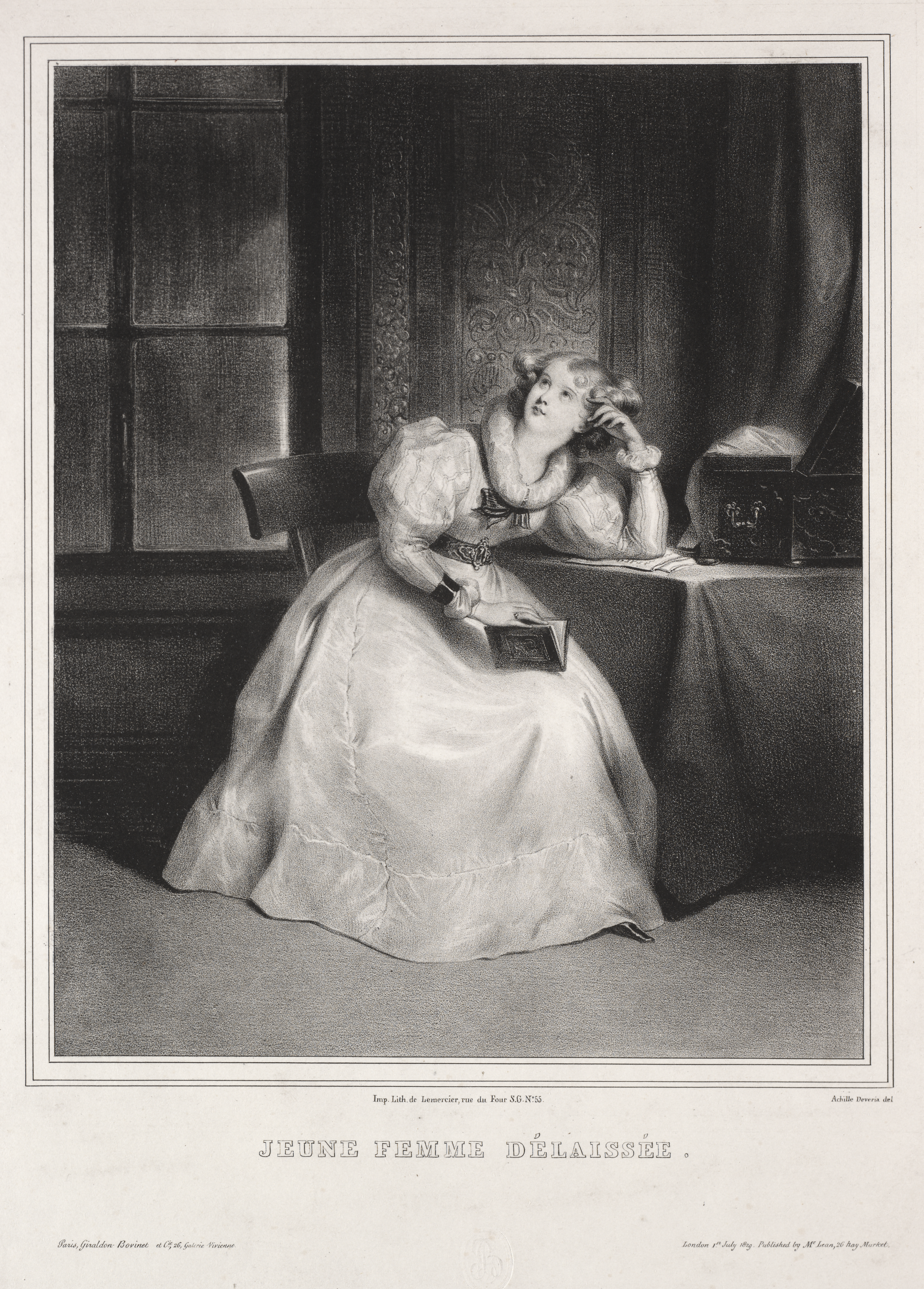
Reverie

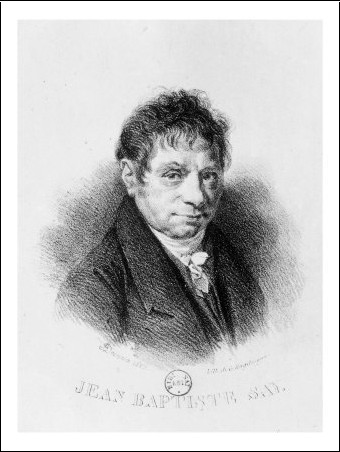
Portrait de Jean-Baptiste Say. Gravure de Godefroy Engelmann d'après un dessin d'Achille Devéria. Source : Les graveurs du 19e siècle : guide de l'amateur d'estampes modernes, volume IX, p. 28

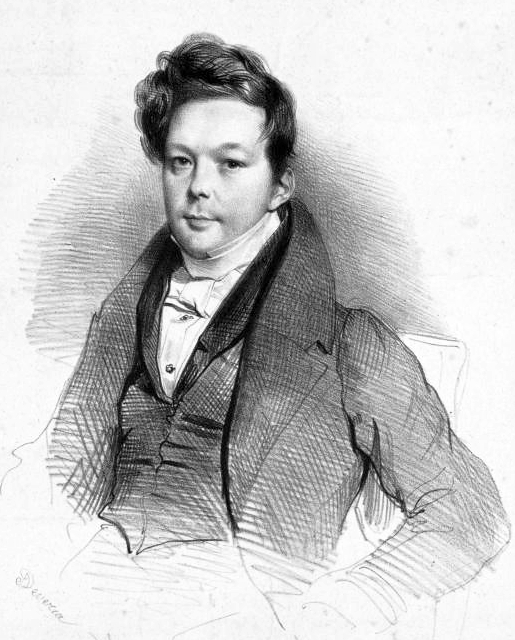
French songwriter and composer Auguste-Marie Panseron (1796-1859) by Achille Devéria (1800-1857).

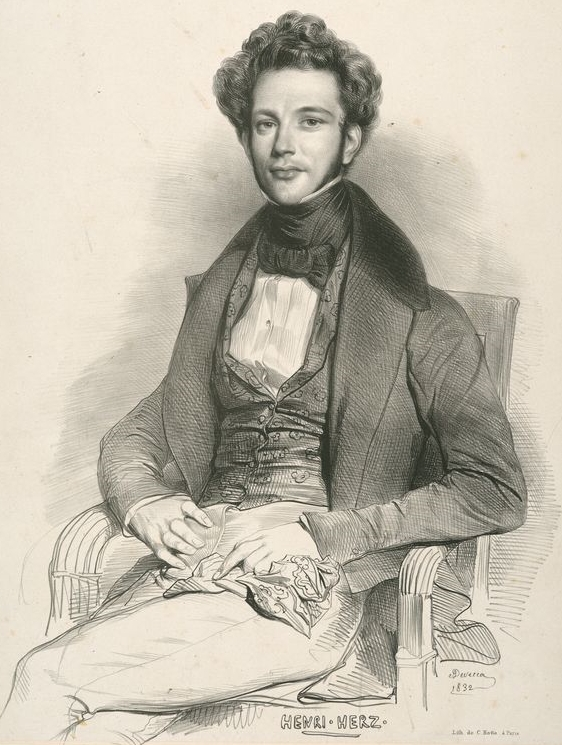
Austrian pianist and composer Henri Herz, 1832.

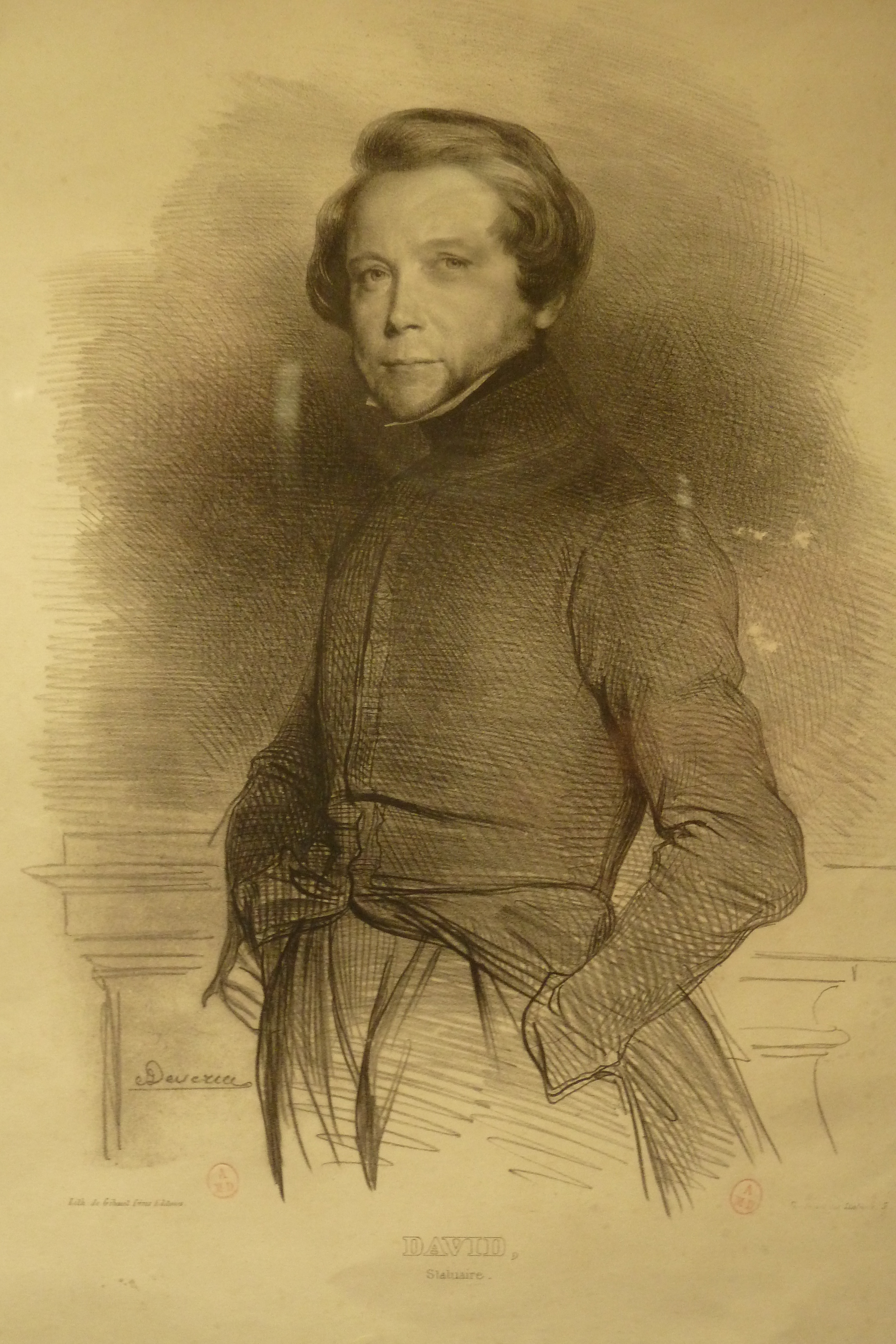
Pierre-Jean David d'Angers, 1838.

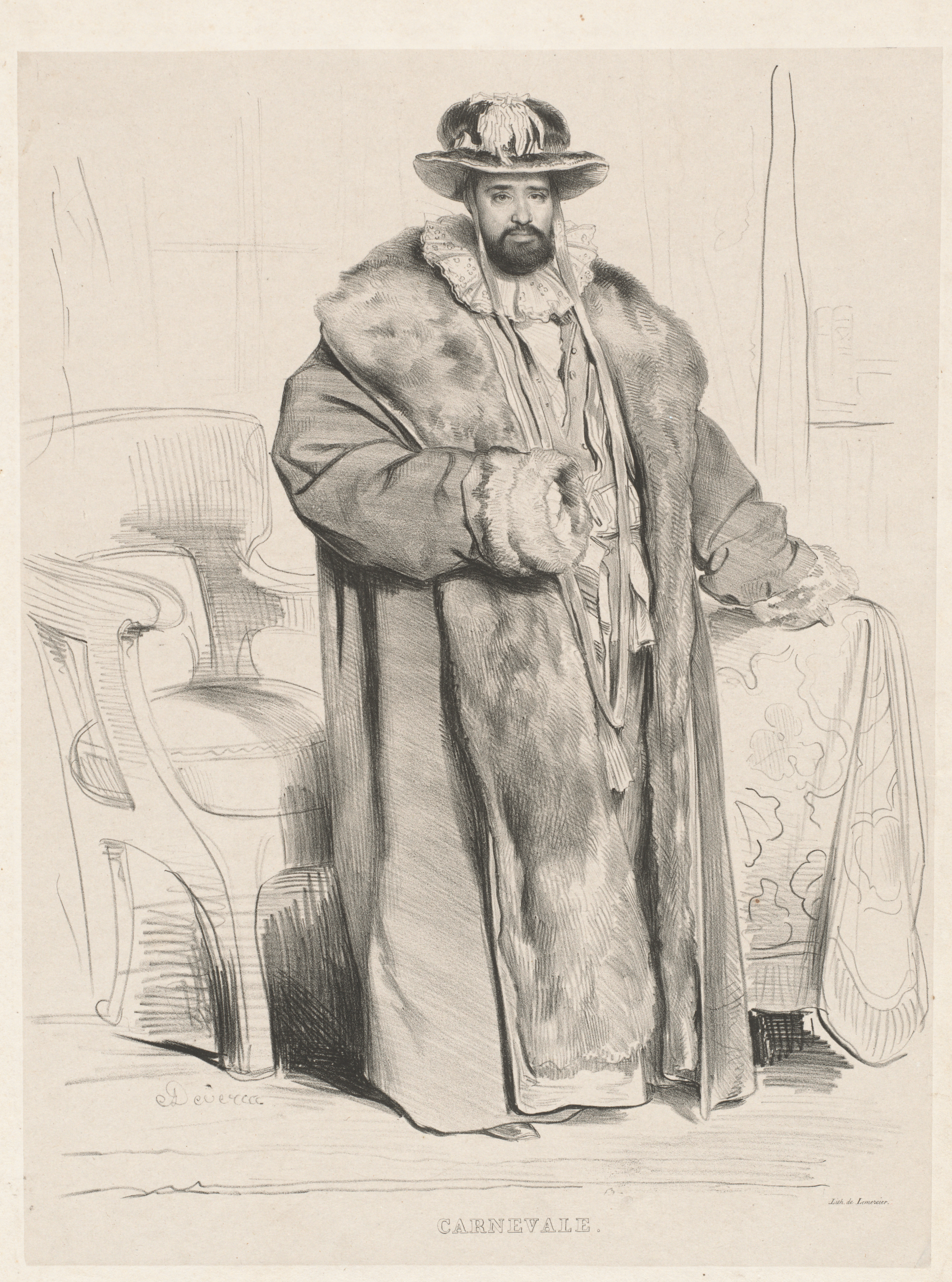
Carnevale

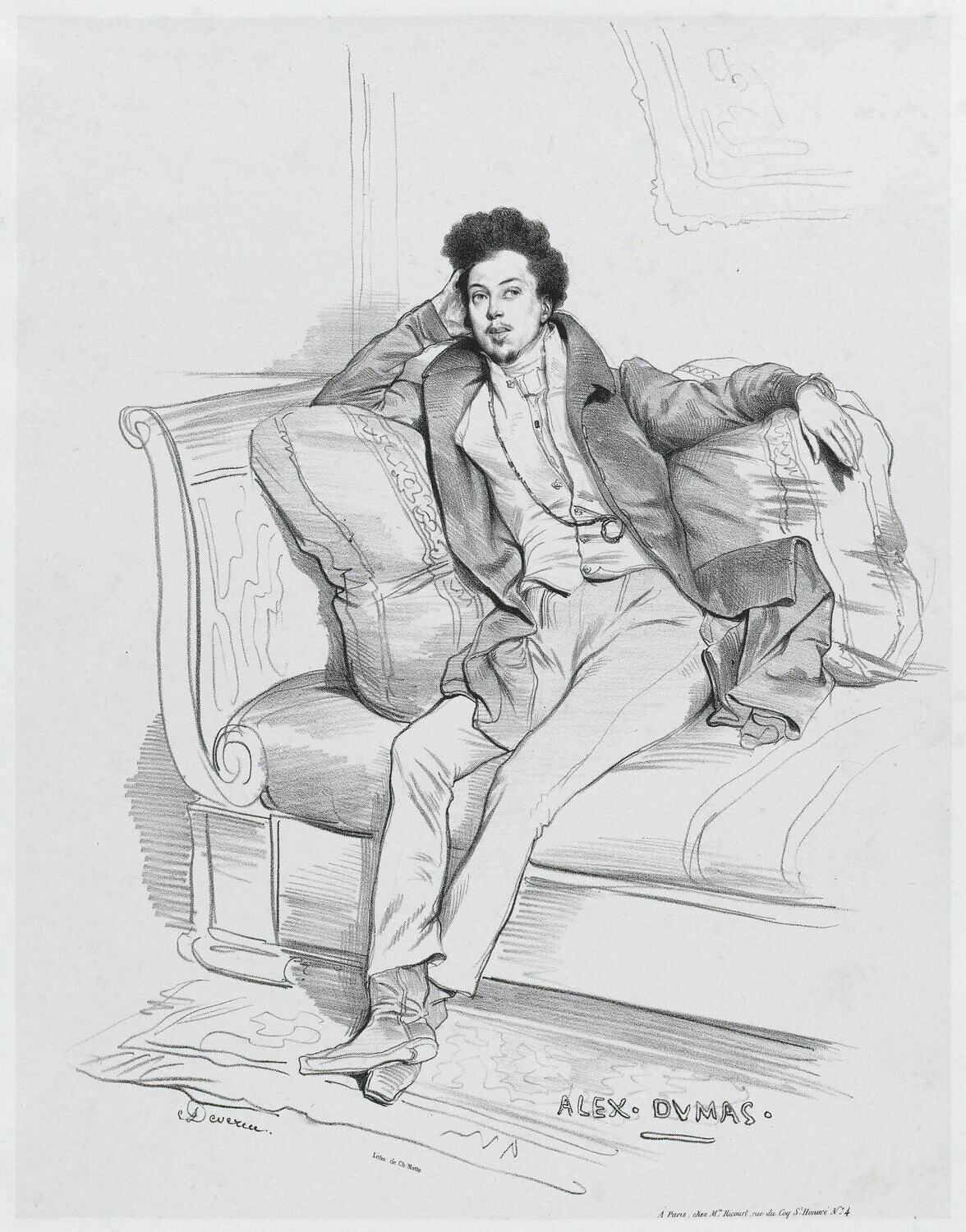
Alexandre Dumas, (1829).

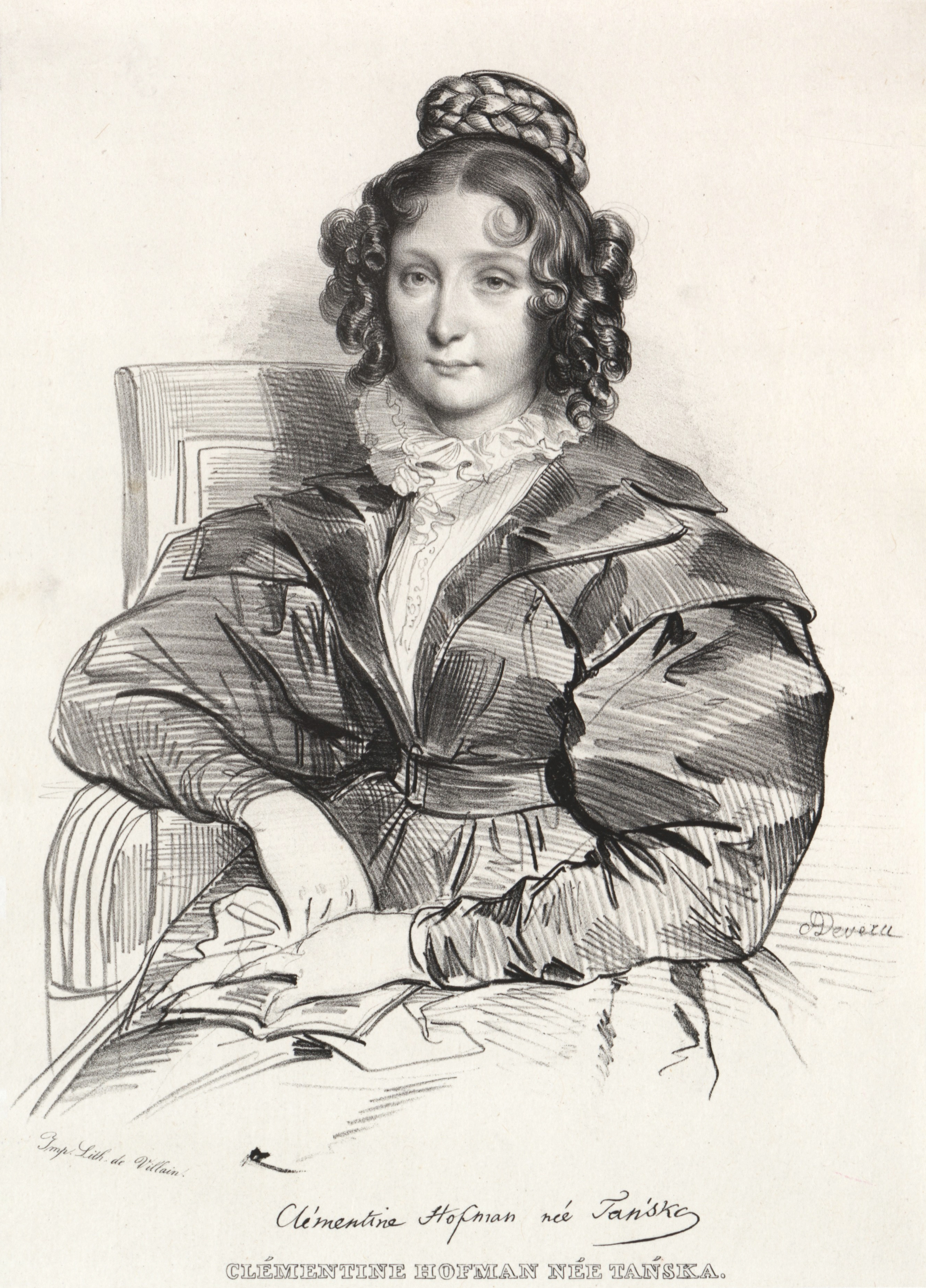
Klementyna Hoffmanowa: A litograph originally published in: Straszewicz J., Die Polen und die Polinnen der Revolution vom 29 November 1830, Stuttgart [1832–1837].

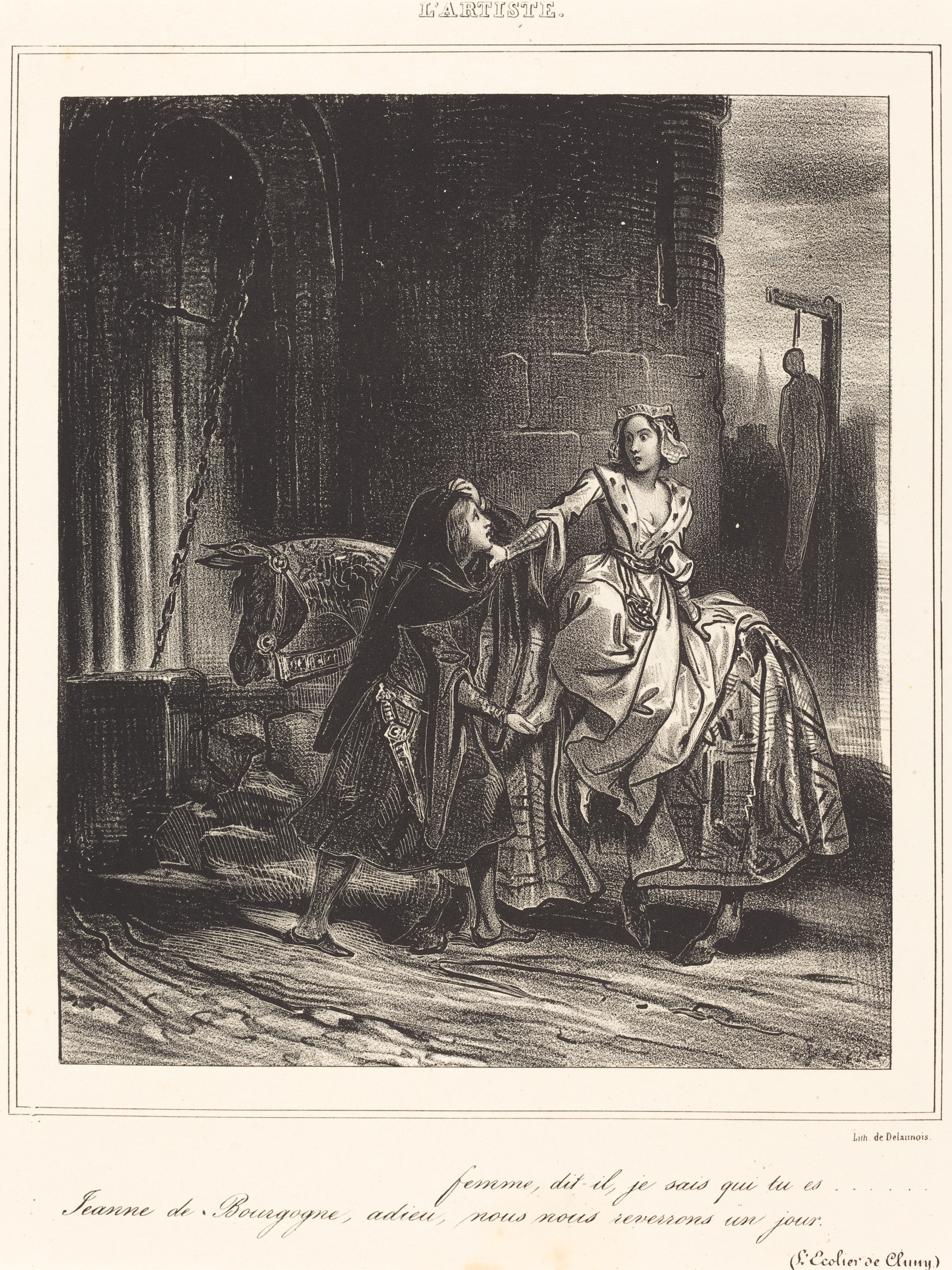
Jeanne de Bourgogne
