= Eugène Devéria =

French painter (1805–1865)

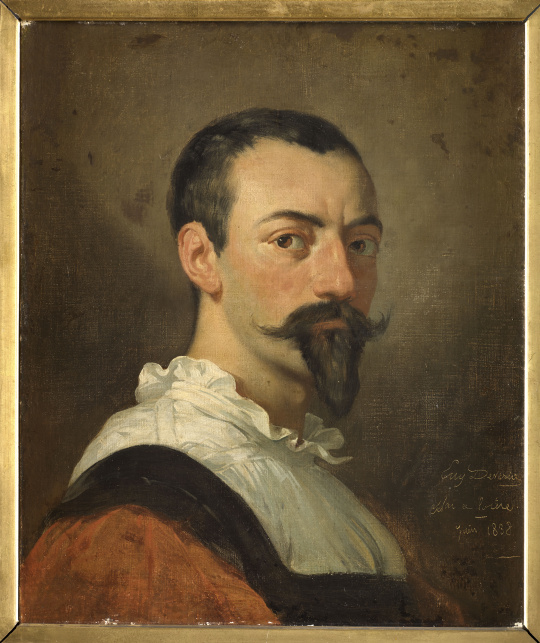
Self-portrait in 1838

Eugène François Marie Joseph Devéria (22 April 1805, in Paris – 3 February 1865, in Pau) was a French Romantic history painter, portraitist and muralist.

== Biography ==
He was one of five children born to François-Marie Devéria, a Bureau Chief in the Ministry of the Navy. His mother, Désirée François-Chaumont, came from a colonial family in Saint-Domingue that fled to France during the Revolution. His brother, Achille, was also a painter. After their father's death, Achille became the family's provider.

Eugène displayed some artistic talent and became Achille's first pupil. Later, he would study with Anne-Louis Girodet and Guillaume Guillon Lethière. His first submissions to the Salon were for the Salon of 1824, but they attracted little notice. His first success came in the 1827 Salon with a canvas depicting the birth of King Henry IV. At this time, he was sharing a studio on the Boulevard Saint Michel with Louis Petitot, Pierre Cartellier and Louis Boulanger.

Although he received several commissions, including one for a "Museum of the History of France" that was being planned by King Louis-Philippe, he was not generally successful. So, in 1838, he accepted a proposal to redo all of the painted decorations at Avignon Cathedral and left Paris. The task turned out to be greater than he expected. Together with unsanitary conditions and a flood that almost took the lives of him and his family, he became ill and exhausted. In 1841, he left Avignon to recuperate in Béarn.

That same year, he married his partner, Caroline-Aglaé Lavie du Rausel (1793-1863), a creole with whom he had been living for many years, and who had given him a daughter in 1831. He was also raising a niece and nephew as his own. When he was feeling better, they all settled in Pau. In 1843, he converted to Protestantism, which soon came to be as important to him as his painting. This created a rift with his family and friends in Paris; one that was never healed.

To support his large family, he gave drawing lessons and painted portraits of the wealthy visitors to Pau. In the summer, he would paint portraits at the spa in Eaux-Bonnes. He continued to send works to the Salon, but they were received with increasing indifference. His last submission was in 1861. He also made several trips abroad, but found few customers. In 1856, he attempted to finish his work in Avignon, but his daughter, Marie, who had accompanied him, died on the return trip. He made another visit to Avignon in 1857, but his work there remained unfinished.

== Selected paintings ==
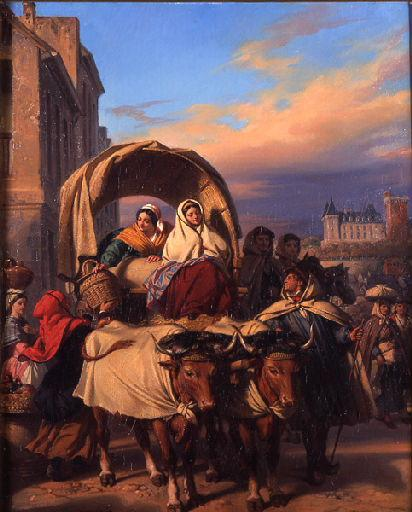
The Return to the Market

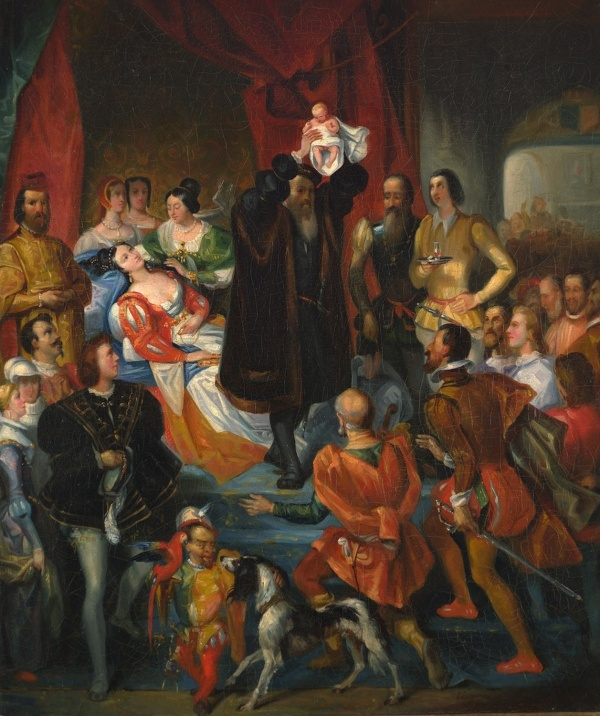
The Birth of Henry IV

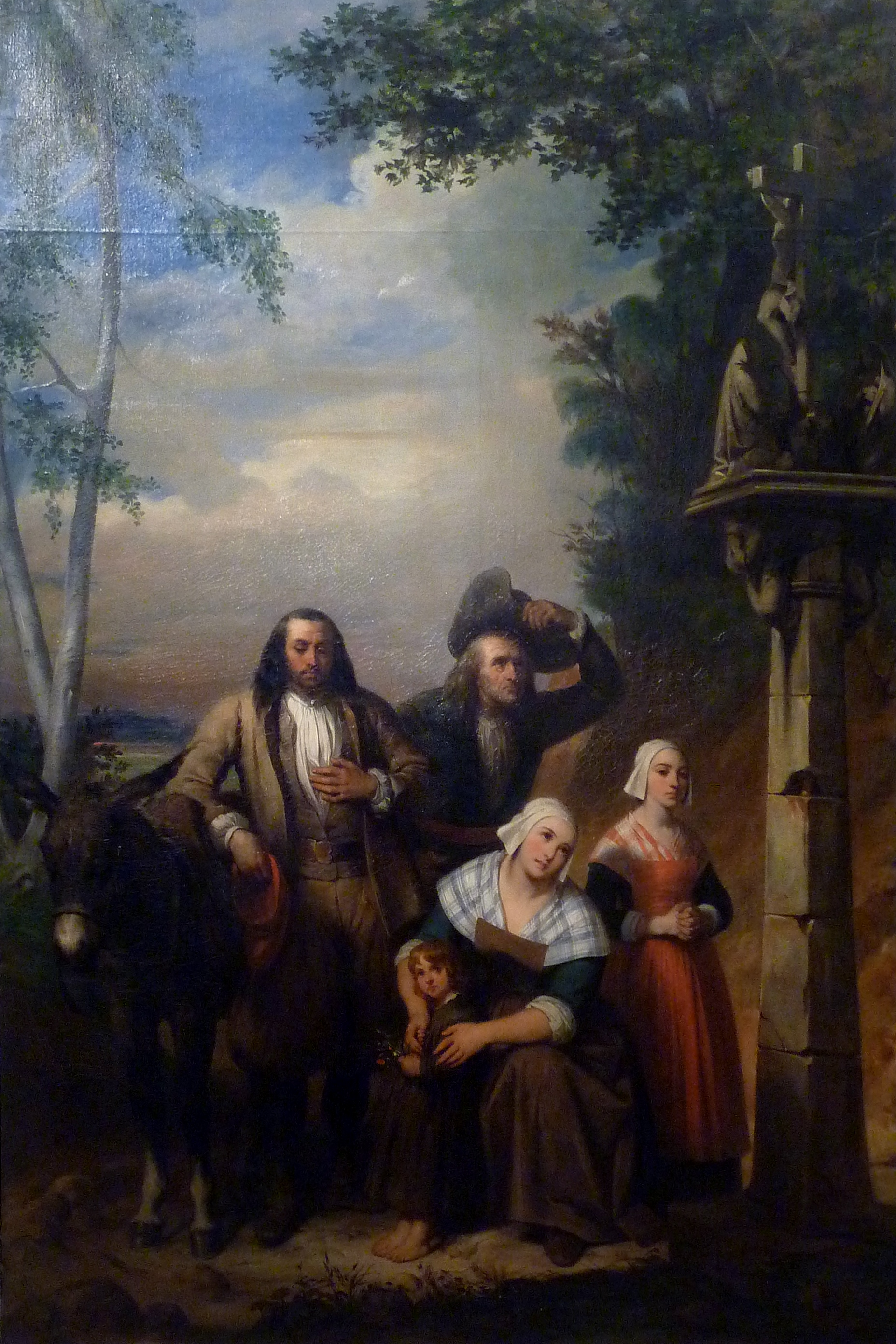
Breton Family, Praying at a Country Shrine

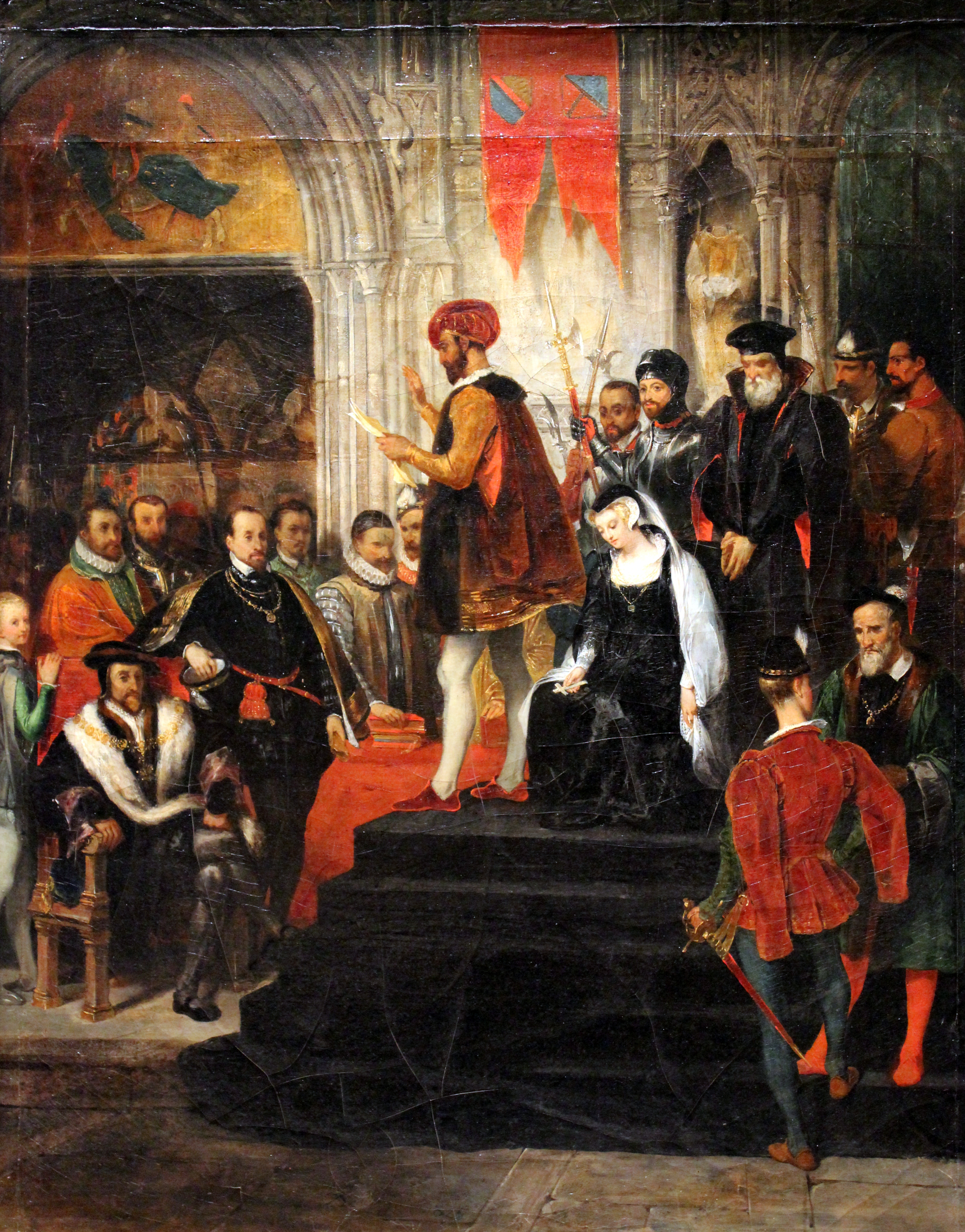
The Reading of Mary Stuart's Sentence

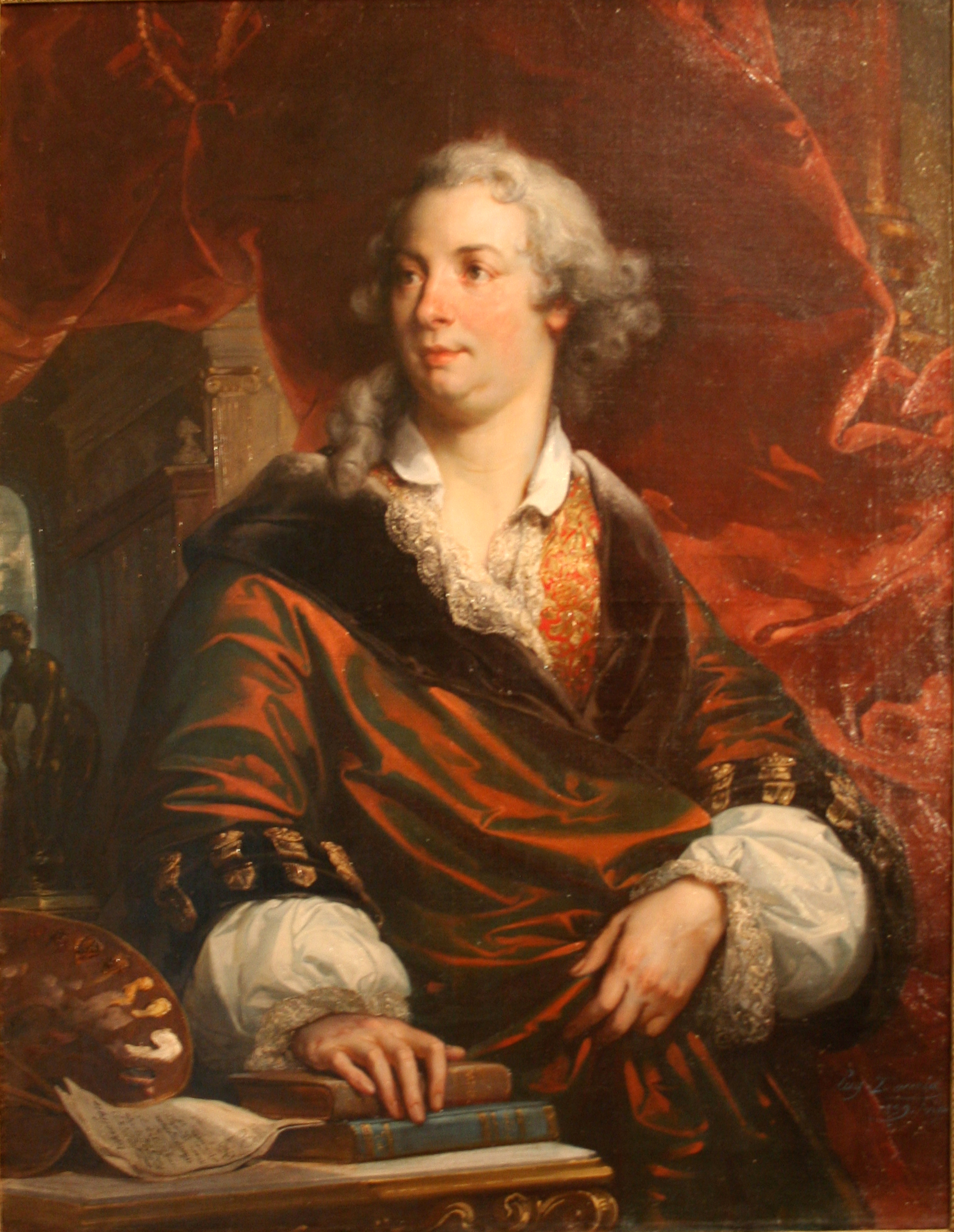
Posthumous portrait of Esprit Calvet

== Sources ==
- Sophie Peyre Alone, Eugène Devéria d’après des documents originaux 1805-1865, Paris, Fischbacher, 1887
- Maximilien Gauthier, La Vie et l’Art romantiques. Achille et Eugène Devéria, Paris, Floury, 1925.
- René Ancely, La Vie pyrénéenne d’Eugène Devéria, Pau, Lescher-Moutoué, 1940.
- Suzanne Tucoo-Chala, "Eugène Devéria : un romantique transplanté en Béarn au milieu du XIXe (1841-1865)", in: Bulletin de la Société des amis du château de Pau, 137, 1998–2, p. 9-32
- Vincent David, Eugène Devéria : La peinture et l'histoire et Eugène Devéria : Variations sur les genres artistiques, Réunion des musées nationaux, Paris, 2005
