= Mysteries of Osiris =

Ancient Egyptian religious festivities

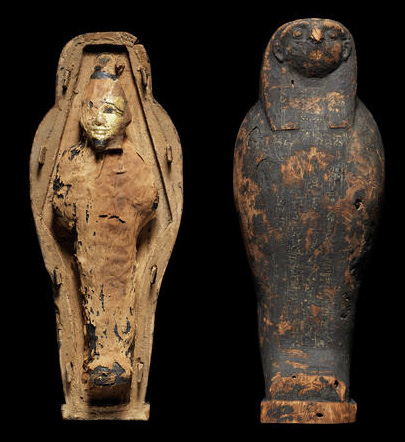
- Type: Religious festivities
- Significance: Commemoration of the martyrdom of Osiris
- Observances: Procession of sacred boats, tributes to the dead
- Begins: 12 Khoiak
- Ends: 30 Khoiak
- Started by: Ancient Egyptians
- Related to: Nilotic Calendar

The Mysteries of Osiris, also known as Osirism, were religious festivities celebrated in ancient Egypt to commemorate the murder and regeneration of Osiris. The course of the ceremonies is attested by various written sources, but the most important document is the Ritual of the Mysteries of Osiris in the Month of Khoiak, a compilation of Middle Kingdom texts engraved during the Ptolemaic period in an upper chapel of the Temple of Dendera. In Egyptian religion, the sacred and the secret are intimately linked. As a result, ritual practices were beyond the reach of the uninitiated, as they were reserved for the priests, the only ones authorised to enter the divine sanctuaries. The most unfathomable theological mystery, the most solemnly precautionary, is the remains of Osiris. According to the Osirian myth, this mummy is kept deep in the Duat, the subterranean world of the dead. Every night, during his nocturnal journey, Ra, the solar god, came there to regenerate by temporarily uniting with Osiris in the form of a single soul.

After the collapse of the Old Kingdom, the city of Abydos became the centre of Osirian belief. Every year, a series of public processions and secret rituals were held there, mimicking the passion of Osiris and organised according to the royal Memphite funeral rituals. During the first millennium BC, the practices of Abydos spread to the country's main cities (Thebes, Memphis, Saïs, Coptos, Dendera, etc.). Under the Lagids, every city demanded to possess a shred of the holy body or, failing that, the lymph that had drained from it. The Mysteries were based on the legend of the removal of Osiris' corpse by Set and the scattering of his body parts throughout Egypt. Found one by one by Isis, the disjointed limbs are reassembled into a mummy endowed with a powerful life force.

The regeneration of the Osirian remains by Isis-Chentayt, the "grieving widow", takes place every year during the month of Khoiak, the fourth of the Nilotic calendar (straddling the months of October and November). In the temples, the officiants set about making small mummiform figurines, called "vegetative Osiris", to be piously preserved for a whole year. These substitutes for the Osirian body were then buried in specially dedicated necropolises, the Osireions or "Tombs of Osiris". The Mysteries are observed when the Nile begins to recede, a few weeks before the fields can be sown again by the farmers. Each of the ingredients used to make the figurines (barley, earth, water, dates, minerals, herbs) is highly symbolic, relating to the main cosmic cycles (solar revolution, lunar phases, Nile flood, germination). The purpose of mixing and moulding them into the body of Osiris was to invoke the divine forces that ensured the renewal of life, the rebirth of vegetation and the resurrection of the dead.

== European Egyptosophy ==
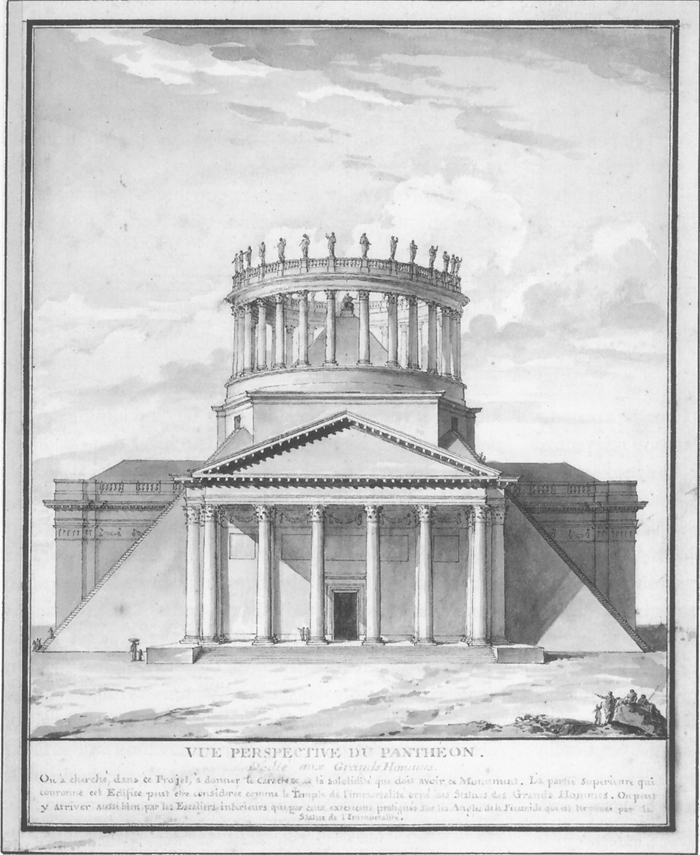
Project to modify the Paris Pantheon into a pyramid, around 1798.

In ancient times, Greek authors such as Herodotus, Diodorus Siculus, Plutarch and Jamblicus developed the idea that Egypt, with its ancient civilisation, was the original cradle of all theological, mythological and ritualistic knowledge. This view is sometimes referred to as 'Egyptosophy', a word blend from the terms 'Egypt' and 'philosophy'. Since the Renaissance, this approach to the history of religions has had a major impact on Western culture. Its influence is particularly evident among those involved in Hermeticism, esotericism and pseudo-sciencism. (Note: The influence of Egyptosophy on Western culture has been studied by the Swiss Egyptologist Erik Hornung in his book L'Égypte ésotérique: le savoir occulte des Égyptiens et son influence en occident, Monaco, Éditions du Rocher, 2001, 274 p.) Egyptosophy has thus influenced spiritual currents of varying degrees of occultism such as alchemy, Rosicrucianism, Freemasonry and theosophy. Since the decolonisation of Europe, Egyptosophy has also had a major influence on Western culture. Since the decolonisation of Africa, this idea has also become the cornerstone of Afrocentrist and Kemitist theorists, the latter seeking an "African renaissance" based on a return to the ancient Egyptian teachings.

From the second half of the seventeenth century onwards, the cliché of "Egypt, land of mysteries" spread throughout the Europe of the Lumières. This commonplace was most perfectly displayed in the opera The Magic Flute by W. Mozart and E. Schikaneder, first performed in 1791. In the middle of the work, the initiates Tamino and Pamina see their vision of the world turned upside down by their initiation into the Secrets by Sarastro, high priest of the Kingdom of Light and worshipper of the gods Isis and Osiris. (Note: Isis, Osiris, send down the spirit of your wisdom upon the young couple who yearn for the light of the temple. You who guide the pilgrim's steps, arm them with courage in trial and make the price of virtue shine in their eyes.) At the same time, the Freemasons believed they had discovered the existence of a dual religion in the "Egyptian mysteries". Within a false polytheistic religion reserved for the common people, there was a true monotheistic religion reserved for a restricted circle of initiates. For the mass of uneducated people, religion was centered on piety, festivals and sacrifices to divinities. These are merely customs designed to maintain social peace and the continuity of the state. At the same time, in the subterranean shadows of the crypts beneath the temples and pyramids, Egyptian priests would have provided moral, intellectual and spiritual training to the elite in their quest for truth, during initiation ceremonies. (Note: The place of ancient Egypt and its alleged dual religion in the thinking of Freemasons has been studied by Egyptologist Jan Assmann in two of his books: L'Égypte ancienne entre mémoire et science, Paris, Chaire du Louvre, 2009, 341 p. Religio duplex: Comment les Lumières ont réinventé la religion des Égyptiens, Paris, Aubier, 412 p.)

== The Mysteries and Egyptology Science ==
=== Textual sources ===
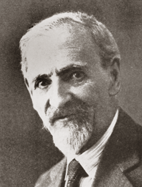
Portrait of Émile Chassinat (1868-1948), French Egyptologist.

Since the 1960s, scientific knowledge of the Egyptian mysteries has progressed considerably thanks to the careful study of inscriptions left on papyrus or on the walls of temples and tombs. Numerous philological and archaeological contributions have challenged European cliches about the "Mysteries of Osiris", revealing the true nature of the rituals and the actual practices of the Egyptian priests. In the 1960s, the Egyptology community brought several major texts to the attention of the general public: firstly, Émile Chassinat's translation into French of the Rituel des mystères d'Osiris au mois de Khoiak, a compilation of Tentyrite inscriptions (this work dates back to the 1940s but was only published posthumously in 1966 and 1968, in two volumes, by the Institut français d'archéologie orientale-IFAO); then the major publications of Papyrus N.3176 by Paul Barguet in 1962, Papyrus Salt 825 by Philippe Derchain in 1964-1965 and the Cérémonial de glorification (Louvre I.3079) by Jean-Claude Goyon in 1967. This work has since been supplemented by more recent works such as the exhaustive publication of the texts of the Osirian chapels atDendera by Sylvie Cauville in 1997, Catherine Graindorge thesis on the god Sekeris at Thebes in 1994 and the contributions of Laure Pantalacci (1981), Horst Beinlich (1984) and Jan Assmann (2000) on Osirian relics. At the same time, the archaeology of remains linked to the cult of Osiris has enriched our knowledge of the spaces dedicated to mystery rituals, such as the catacombs of Karnak and Oxyrhynchus.

=== Mystery ritual of the Osireion of Dendera ===
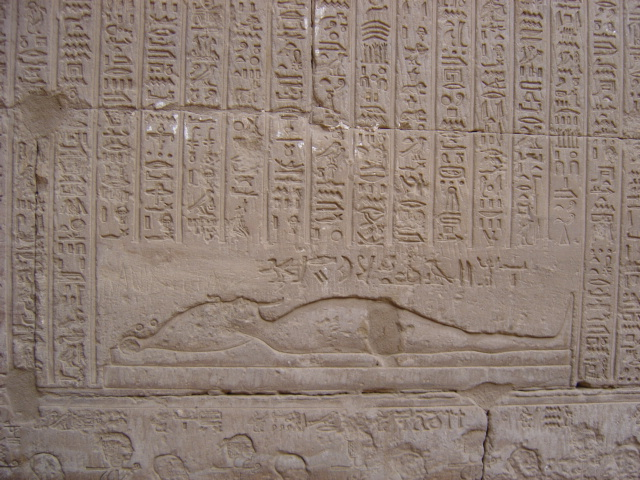
Text and illustration of the Ritual of the Mysteries (columns 106 to 121), Temple of Dendera.

In the academic world of Egyptology, knowledge of the "Mysteries of Osiris" is based mainly on late inscriptions from temples dating from the Greco-Roman period. Among these, the texts of the six chapels of the Osireion of Dendera (located on the roof of the Temple of Hathor) are the most important source. Our understanding of the ritual, its local variants and its religious context is based primarily on the Ritual of the Mysteries of Osiris, engraved at the very end of the Ptolemaic period. This source is rich in detail, but often confusing, as it is a compilation of seven books of different origins (Busiris and Abydos) and different periods (Middle Kingdom and Ptolemaic period). The inscription takes the form of a succession of one hundred and fifty-nine hieroglyphic columns arranged on three of the four walls of an open-air courtyard (the first eastern chapel). The first major translation into French was by Victor Loret in 1882, under the title Les fêtes d'Osiris au mois de Khoiak. However, Émile Chassinat annotated translation, Le Mystère d'Osiris au mois de Khoiak (834 pages), published late in 1966 and 1968, remains the standard work. In 1997, this translation was modernised, albeit almost unchanged, by Sylvie Cauville in her exhaustive publication with commentary of the texts of the Osirian chapels of Dendera.

== The nature of Egyptian mysteries ==
=== Secret rituals ===
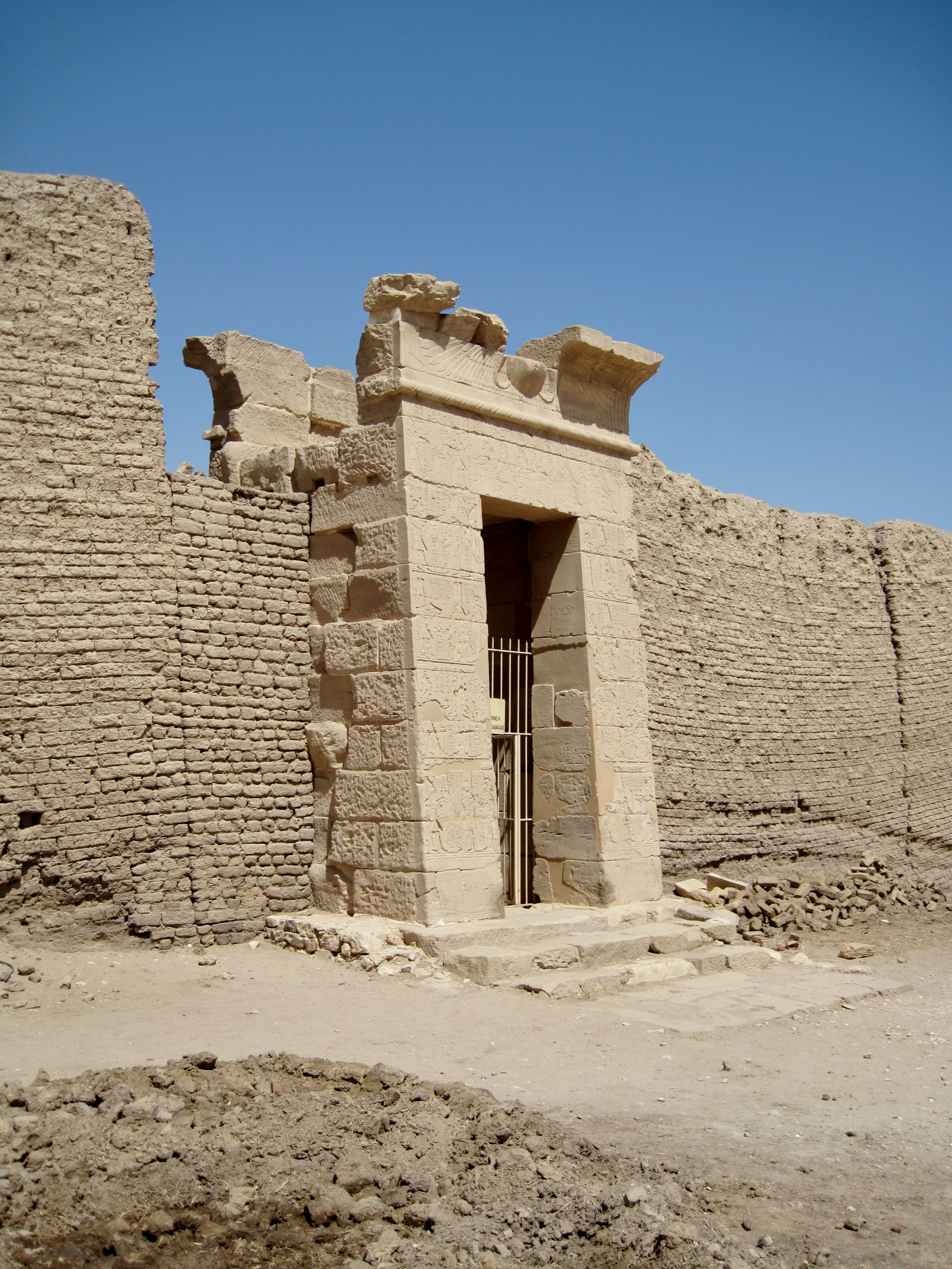
Door and surrounding wall of the temple at Deir el-Medineh.

Egyptian civilisation undeniably had secret rites. Most of the rituals performed by the priests were carried out behind the walls of the temples, in the absence of the general public. The general public usually had no access to the temple. On feast days, crowds were allowed into the forecourts, but never into the sanctuary's holy of holies. In the Egyptian mentality, djeser ('sacred') and seshta ('secret') are two notions that go hand in hand. The word 'sacred' also means 'to separate' or 'to keep apart'. In essence, then, the sacred is something that must be kept separate from the profane. Divine power is not confined to heaven or the beyond. Its presence also manifests itself on Earth among human beings. Temples, for the gods, and necropolises, for the ancestors, are places where priests exercise their role as mediators between humankind and the forces of the invisible. They are places apart, kept away from the majority of the living, and their access is subject to restrictions of all kinds, such as bodily purity, fasting and the obligation of silence.

This clear distinction between sacred places and the profane world led the ancient Egyptians to endow sacredness with a strong obligation of secrecy. The priests who performed the rites in the temples were therefore bound to silence. They must not say anything about what they are doing. In the Book of the Dead, the deceased priest congratulates himself on having taken part in the cult ceremonies in the country's main towns and emphasises that he has disclosed nothing of what he has done, seen or heard.

"The Osiris N (Note: By convention, in the translations, the letter N replaces the name, profession and honorary titles of the deceased.) will say nothing of what he has seen, the Osiris N. will not repeat what he has heard that is mysterious" —Book of the Dead, chap 133. Translation by Paul Barguet.

=== Cosmic secrets ===
==== Solar journey ====
The two greatest divine powers, the most secret and most inaccessible, are Ra, the Sun god and Osiris of Abydos, the ruler of the dead. In his treatise The Mysteries of Egypt, devoted to the Egyptian and Babylonian religions, the Neoplatonist philosopher Iamblichus, summarizes in a short formula the two greatest mysteries of Egyptian belief:

If all things persevere in immobility and renewed perpetuity, it is because the course of the sun never stops; if all things remain perfect and complete, it is because the mysteries of Abydos are never revealed. — Iamblichus, The Mysteries of Egypt, VI, 7.

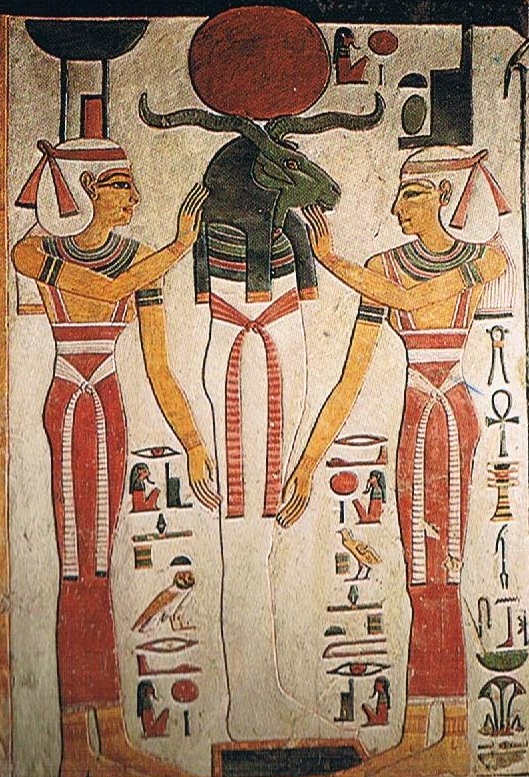
Union of Ra into Osiris under the protection of Nephthys and Isis (tomb of Nefertari).

The path of the Sun inspired the Egyptians with a very abundant and developed religious literature. However, a clear distinction can be made as to their recipients. Some texts are clearly intended for the greatest number of people. These are hymns to the Sun, prayers addressed to the star at particular times of the day, in the morning when the star appears outside the mountains of the eastern horizon, halfway to celebrate its culmination and in the evening when it disappears on the western horizon. For most of the hymns, these are inscriptions engraved at the entrance to tombs, on steles placed inside or outside chapels or, even, on the papyri of the Book of the Dead . Accessible to all, these texts do not claim to transmit or ignore secret teaching. The other group of texts codifies and transmits knowledge reserved only for the pharaoh. These are the Books of the afterlife: the Book of Amduat, the Book of Gates, the Book of Caves, etc. Their images and texts exclusively adorn the walls of the tombs of the sovereigns of the New Kingdom . They present, hour by hour, the nocturnal journey of the Sun through the lands of the beyond. (Note: For a general overview of these texts, see Erik Hornung, Les Textes de l'au-delà dans l'Égypte ancienne: Un aperçu introductif, Monaco, Le Rocher, 1997, 251 p.. For a translation of the oldest composition, see François Schuler, Le Livre de l'Amdouat, Paris, Librairie José Corti, 2005, 309 p.) This secret literature exposes the most occult of knowledge, the regeneration of the Sun deep within the Earth, that is to say its nocturnal renewal in a circuit which connects the end to the beginning in an existence freed from mortality. In the middle of the night, the solar star unites temporarily with the mummy of Osiris. From this union, he draws the life force necessary for his regeneration. Unlike the other deaths, the Sun does not become Osiris but rests within him, for a brief moment, in a single soul known under the name of "ba reunited", reunion of Re and Osiris or in the form of a criocephalic mummy called “The one with the ram’s head”:

Re sets in the mountain of the West and illuminates the underworld with its rays.

It is Re who rests in Osiris, it is Osiris who rests in Re.

— Book of the Dead, chapter 15 (excerpt)

==== Osirian corpse ====
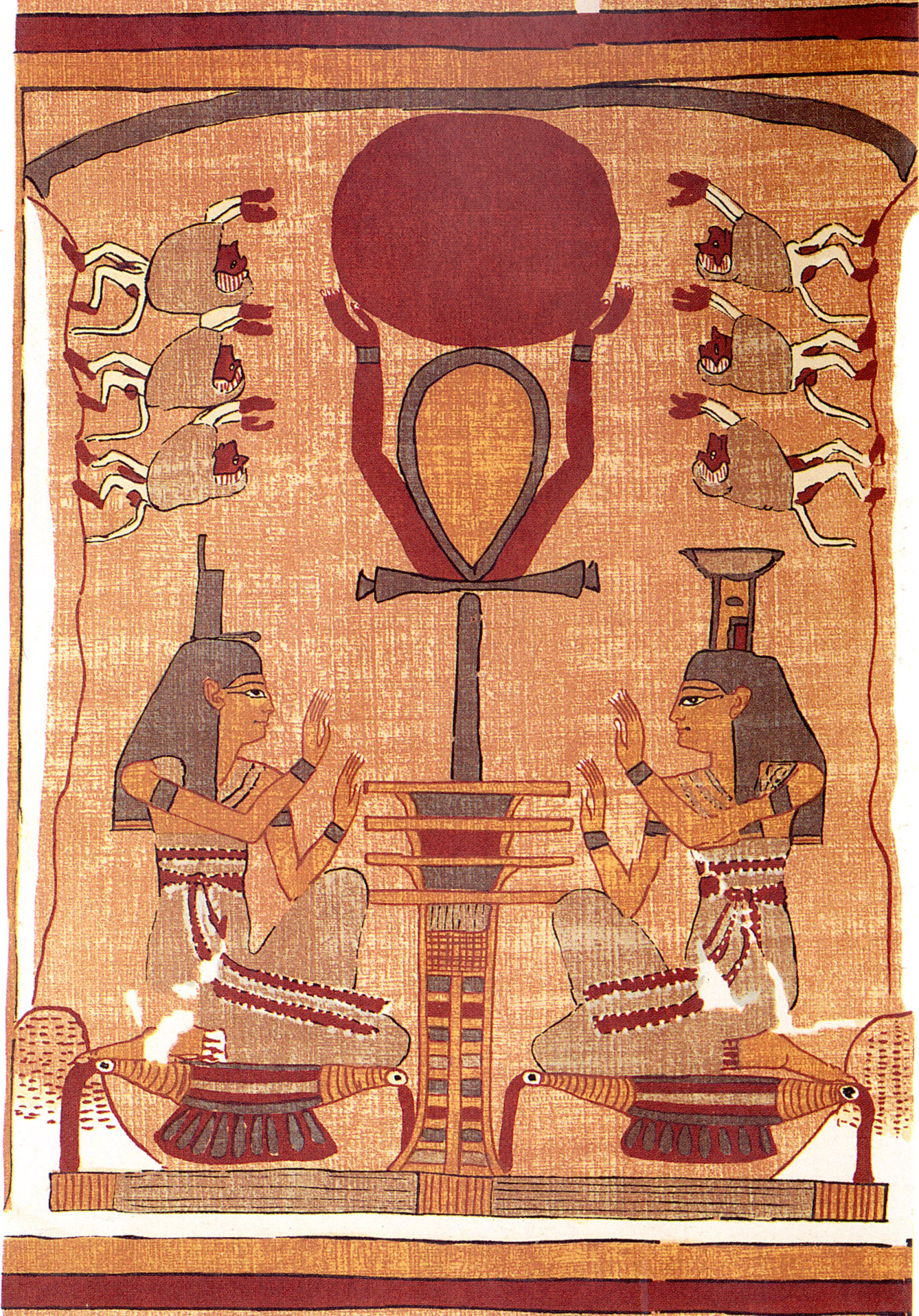
Rebirth of the sun after its union with Osiris, depicted in the form of a Djed pillar surmounted by an anthropomorphised nkh knot (Ani Papyrus).

According to the occult literature of the Books of the Beyond, the greatest secret, the most unfathomable mystery of Egyptian beliefs, is the mummified remains of Osiris. In these texts, the sun god is "He whose secret is hidden", the underworld being the place "which shelters the secret". The word “secret” here designates the Osirian corpse on which the tired star comes to rest every night:

They keep the secret of the great god, invisible to those who are in the Duat. […] Ra said to them: You have received my image, you have embraced my secret, you rest in the castle of Benben, in the place which shelters my remains, what I am. —Book of Gates

The Egyptians had a custom of not talking about the death of Osiris. Generally speaking, from the Pyramid Texts to the Greco-Roman documents, the murder of Osiris, his mourning and his tomb are only evoked by allusions or by clever circumlocutions . We can thus read “As for the arou-tree of the West, it stands for Osiris for the affair which happened under him." (Papyrus Salt 825). The matter in question is, obviously, the burial of Osiris, the tree being planted on the site of the divine tomb. The Egyptians also used euphemisms, especially in the late period. So instead of saying “misfortune has befallen Osiris”, the statement is reversed by saying “misfortune has befallen the enemy of Osiris”. By postulating that speech and writing had within them a magical power, the Egyptians feared that the simple act of speaking of a mythical episode such as the death of Osiris risked making it happen again by simple enunciation. In the Papyrus Jumilhac, the murder of Osiris is thus eluded: instead of writing "Then Set threw Osiris to the ground", the scribe writes "Then he knocked the enemies of Osiris to the ground".

=== Initiation to the mysteries ===
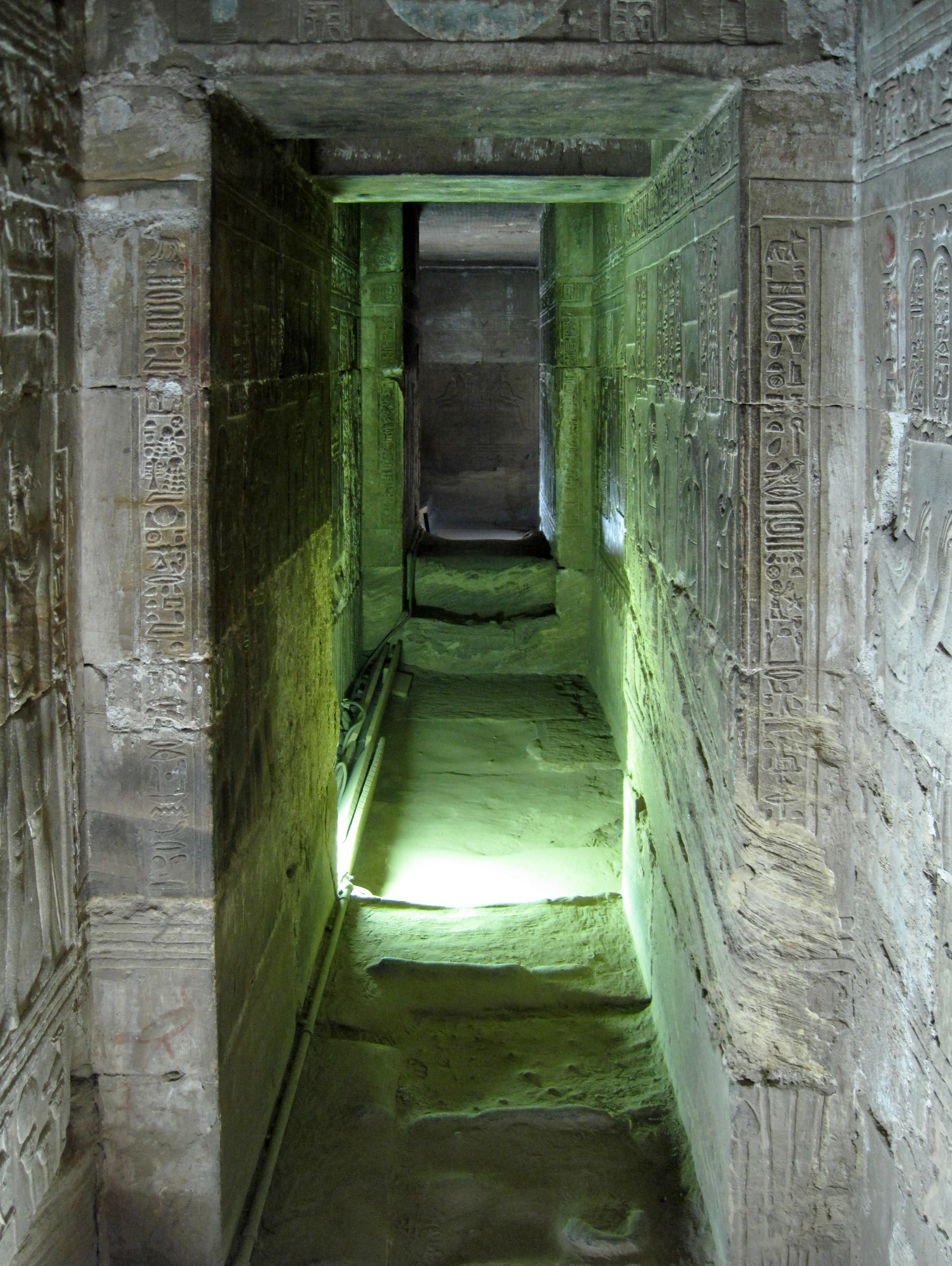
Crypt of the temple of Dendera with mystical decorations.

Egyptian texts say nothing about the existence of an initiation ceremony which would have allowed a new priest to access the temple and its theological secrets for the first time. We had to wait until the 2nd century, under the reign of the Roman emperor Hadrian, to encounter a text of this type. The source is not Egyptian, but the context is Egyptian. This is the initiation of Lucius, the main character of The Golden Ass, a novel written in the 2nd century by Apuleius of Madaure. The scene takes place not in Egypt, but in Greece, in Cenchrea, where there was then a temple of Isis. In this Greek context, it seems that the Hellenic followers of the Egyptian gods reinterpreted the Nilotic funerary rites, to stage them as an initiation of the living and not as a burial of the dead. The ceremony appears as an anticipated death and a descent into hell in order to approach the solar divinity during his union with Osiris. The question of the existence, in Egypt itself, of initiatory rituals remains largely controversial. While the idea of initiation is widely accepted in Egyptosophy circles, this possibility is mostly rejected by proponents of academic Egyptology. In Alexandria and Greece, in a syncretic interpretation, it is probable that the Osirian rituals merged with the Greek mysteries, such as those of Eleusis where young applicants were psychologically tested during nocturnal ceremonies, before receiving a revelation about the world divine.

There are therefore no Egyptian written sources suggesting an initiation of priests in the Pharaonic era. For the German Egyptologist Jan Assmann, it is however not aberrant to think that the ancient Egyptians acquired the secrets of the afterlife during their lifetime, in order to prepare for death. We can then imagine that the Egyptian myst was led, during a symbolic journey, into underground rooms, such as the Osireion of Abydos, the crypts of late temples, or into other places richly decorated with mystical illustrations and symbolic.

== Mysteries of Osiris in Abydos ==
From the Middle Kingdom, an annual religious festival took place in the city of Abydos, featuring the martyrdom and regeneration of the god Osiris. During secret ritual operations, officiants fashioned figurines and simulacra of relics. These sacred objects were kept for a whole year within the temple. They were then buried after being carried in procession to a specially dedicated necropolis. With the growing importance of the cult of Osiris, these mysteries took on national importance by being performed concomitantly in all the cities of the country during the month of Khoiak.

=== History ===
==== Abydos, holy city ====
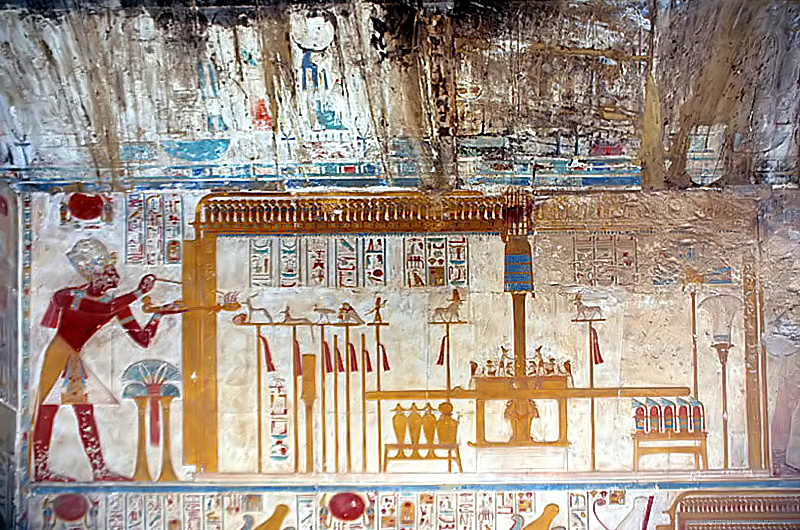
Pharaoh incensing the portable reliquary at Abydos (bas-relief from the funerary temple of Sety I).

Every year, during the month of Khoiak, in the city of Abydos, celebrations were held during which the statue of Osiris was carried in procession, out of his temple, to the Osirisirian tomb of Ro-Peker, probably located in the burial area known by the modern name of Umm El Qa'ab. During the Middle Kingdom, a historical period spanning the 11th and 12th dynasties, the ancient Egyptians likened the tomb of King Djer of the 1st Dynasty to the mythical tomb of Osiris. This identification certainly finds its origin in the antiquity of the royal tomb, because more than a thousand years separate the two periods in question. During excavations carried out in 1897-1898, the French archaeologist Émile Amélineau discovered, in the mythical tomb, a statue of Osiris lying on his burial bed. This discovery, however, remains controversial, the dating of this work not being formally established. (Note: The scientific conclusions of this discovery remain uncertain. Despite the controversy, Émile Amélineau remained convinced until his death that he had discovered the Abydonian tomb of Osiris. However, other hypotheses can be put forward. The dating of this recumbent remains debated; it is thought to date from either the late Middle Kingdom or the Saite period. It has been suggested that the recumbent originally stood in the temple and that it was transported to Umm el-Qa'ab for safekeeping during the religious persecution of pagans by Christians at the beginning of our era.) Pilgrims flocked from all over the country to attend the processions and commemorated their passage with steles placed in chapels built along the ceremonial route. These festivities were celebrated throughout the New Kingdom, except during the Amarna period. Under the 19th dynasty, pharaonic munificence endowed the city with new cult complexes, such as the temple of Seti I and the Osireion. At the end of the Ramesside period, dynastic crises interrupted the success of Abydos, but the festivities regained their luster thanks to the political stability of the Saite period, during which numerous memorial stelae flourished again.

==== Origins of the preponderance of Abydos ====
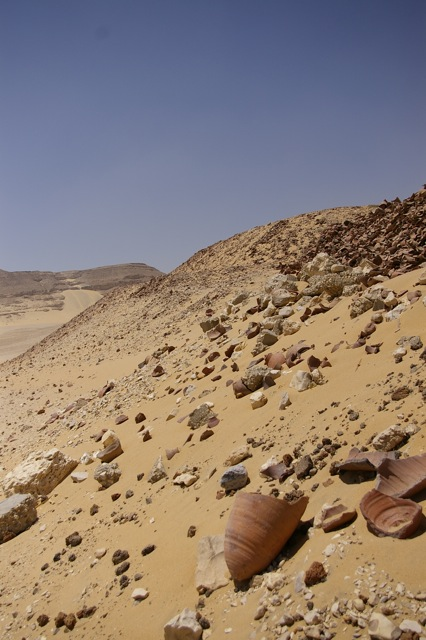
View of the remains of the Abydos necropolis.

The religious fame of the Osirian Mysteries of Abydos (Note: On the archaeological site of Abydos, see: (David O'Connor, Abydos: Egypt's First Pharaohs and the cult of Osiris, London, Thames and Hudson, 2009, 216 p. Sydney Hervé Aufrère, Jean-Claude Goyon and Jean-Claude Golvin, "Aux origines du 'Double-Pays': chap. III", in L'Égypte restituée: Sites et temples de Haute Égypte, Paris, Éditions Errance, 1991, pp. 27-47.) dates back to the First Intermediate Period, a time of social unrest resulting from the decay of the state institutions of the Old Kingdom. Previously, during the prosperous age of the Pharaonic monarchy, splendid necropolises made up of mastabas were organized around the Memphite pyramids. These places of eternity allowed any deceased notable to benefit from the immediate vicinity of the royal funeral cult and to benefit from the generous redistribution of food offerings. With the disappearance of these necropolises, Abydos, the ancient cemetery of the first pharaohs (Thinite era), symbolically takes over by becoming the ideal necropolis to which every dignitary must refer to hope for post-mortem salvation. The god Osiris, the mythical paragon of the dead pharaohs, becomes the great god of the necropolis by ousting the jackal god Khenti-Amentiu. The Mysteries of Abydos, centered on the martyrdom of Osiris, are in fact nothing other than the transposition of the royal funerary ritual from the time of the pyramids into a divine ritual repeated annually. At the same time, in Memphis, a similar annual funerary festival developed around Seker, the mummified falcon god. The basic structure is the same. In place of the remains of the dead pharaoh, a ritual is set up based on a simulacrum of a body, a mummiform effigy fashioned for eight days, followed by a liturgical vigil during a sacred night ( Haker festival in Abydos; Netjeryt festival in Memphis) and a funeral procession intended to convey the effigy to its tomb (thanks to the neshmet barque in Abydos and the Hennu barque in Memphis).

==== Coming out to daylight ====
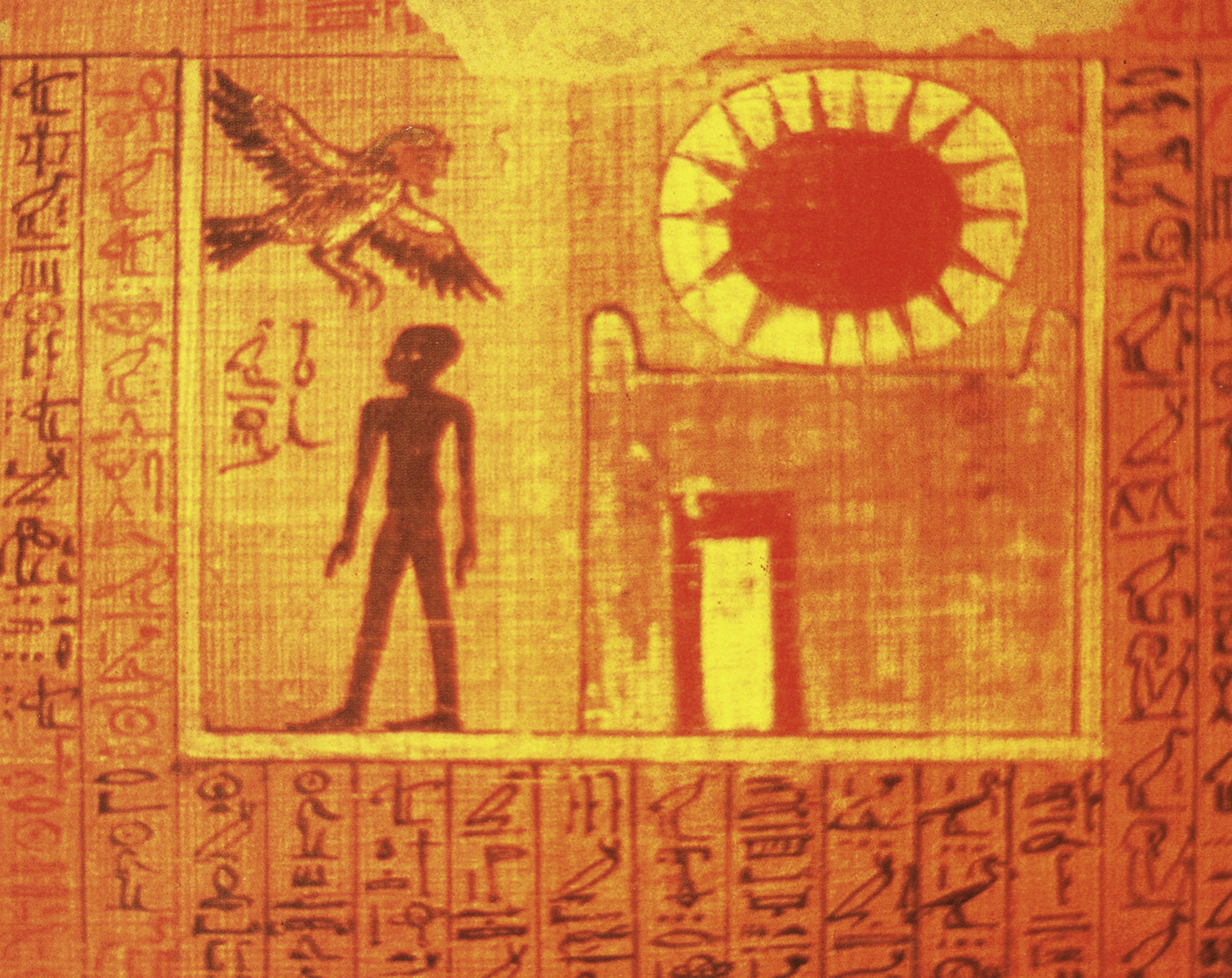
The emergence of Neferubenef from the tomb in the daylight; Book of the Dead, chap. 92 (Musée du Louvre).

From the Middle Kingdom, the idea emerged among the ancient Egyptians that the religious festival was a sacred period during which the ancestors could “return to daylight” ( peret em herou ) from the underground world of the dead in order to participate in the celebrations. festive performances performed by the living, their descendants. For the duration of the celebration, the opposition between here below and the beyond is abolished or, at the very least, diminished. The statues of the deities emerge from the solitude of their sanctuaries and appear to the crowd. The living visit their deceased in the necropolises. The Akh (“ancestral spirits”), thanks to their Ba (“soul”), return the favor to humans by participating, as a family, in banquets and celebrations. In the Middle Kingdom, steles mention the wish to participate post-mortem in the great religious festivals of the “Mysteries of Abydos” which are the annual reiteration of the myth of Osiris through the grace of the ritual. The highlight of this mystical event is the procession of a statue of Osiris in a portable boat from his temple at Abydos to the sacred mound of Ro-Peqer (the mythical tomb of the god), located less than two kilometers to the south of the holy city. According to the myth, the god was assassinated by his brother Set and regenerated by his wife Isis in the form of an eternal mummy deposited in this place. Subsequently, during the New Kingdom, this desire to participate jointly, living and ancestors, in a festive moment, extended to other celebrations (Abydean, Theban, Memphite and other festivals) while leaving the religious preponderance to the "Mysteries of Abydos”. This fact has a lasting impact on Egyptian funerary thought until the end of ancient civilization and is expressed, most perfectly, in the corpus of the Book of the Dead or "Book for emerging into the light", a sort of vade mecum showing the geography, the dangers, the dodges and the paths to the afterlife for the deceased wishing to come and go between the two worlds.

==== National cult ====
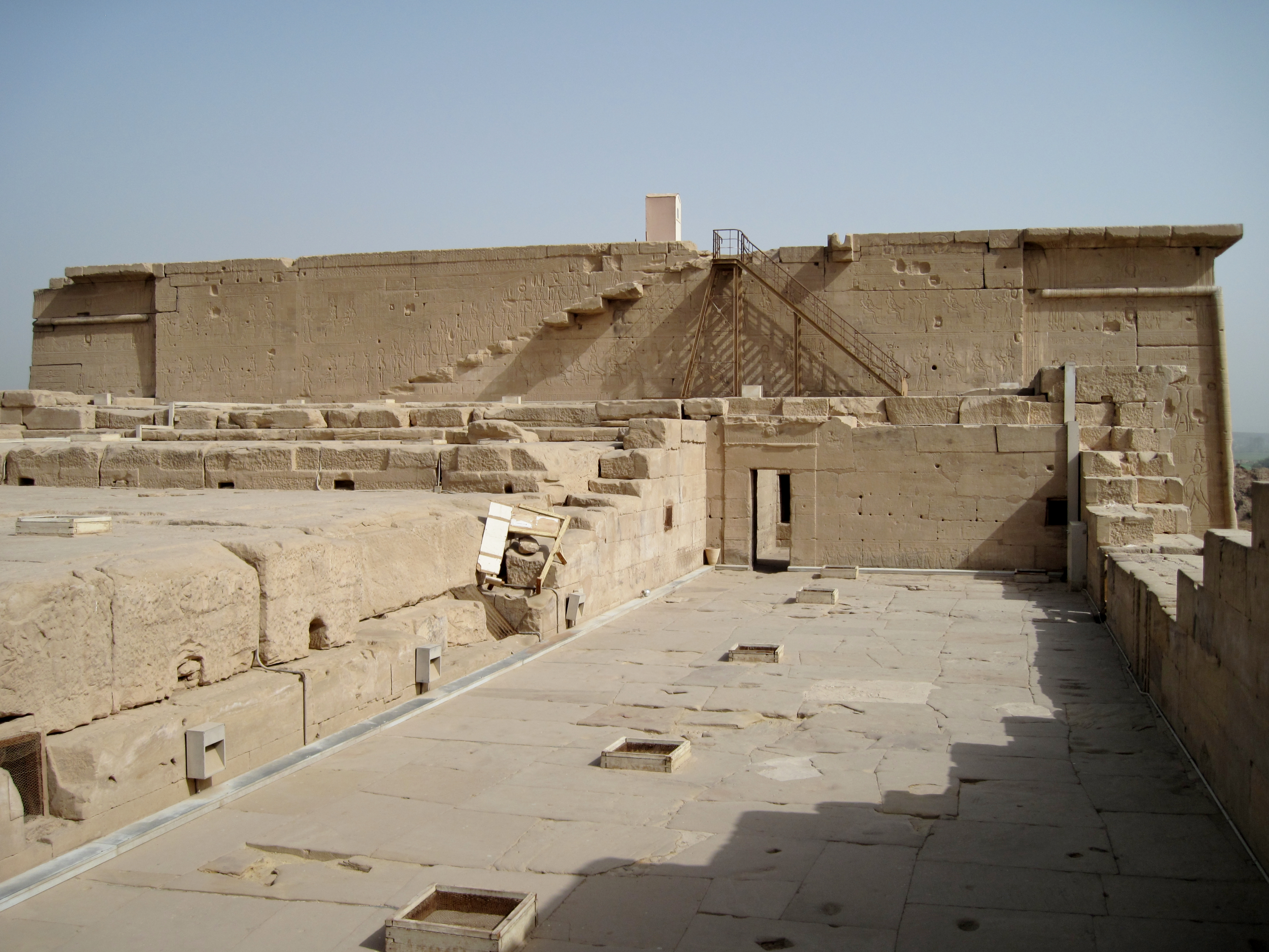
View of the terrace of the Temple of Dendera, where the chapels dedicated to the rites of the mysteries of Osiris are located.

During the first millennium BC, although ancient Egypt was in its twilight, it remained a living civilization where religious beliefs underwent profound changes. From the 6th century, the country of the Nile gradually lost its political independence by being the victim of a succession of foreign occupations (Persians, Nubians, Macedonians, Romans). The Egyptian elites, politically downgraded by these external authorities, then took refuge within the temples to maintain their income, their prestige and their social status. This clericalization of culture leads to the production of intense theological reflections. The ancient traditions are rethought and developed into a very complex symbolic system, based in particular on the myth of the dismemberment of Osiris and the demonization of the god Set. (Note: See, for example, issue 22 of the journal Egypte, Afrique et Orient (September 2001) devoted to the god Seth during the first millennium BC.) The written culture of hieroglyphics was profoundly modified, with the number of signs multiplied tenfold. Learning to write becomes an extremely difficult art requiring around ten years of study. It is probable that this complexity produced a break between the mass of the Egyptian people and the priests busy with their magico-religious speculations behind the surrounding walls of the temples. (Note: The evolution of Egyptian thought in the late period and the Egyptian origins of Hermetic thought have been studied by Sydney Hervé Aufrère (Aufrère 2007).) The most important change is the growing importance of the cult of Osiris. The devotion shown to him leaves the funerary domain, where he was strictly confined since the Old Kingdom, to reach individuals in search of a religion of salvation. The Osirian belief spread outside its original metropolises of Abydos, in the south, and Busiris, in the north, to reach all the cities of the country where, within each temple, chapels dedicated specifically to the Mysteries developed. The most famous example is the Osireion of Dendera, a complex of six chapels located on the roof of the temple of Hathor.

=== Progress of the Abydean festivities ===
==== Stele of Ikhernofret ====
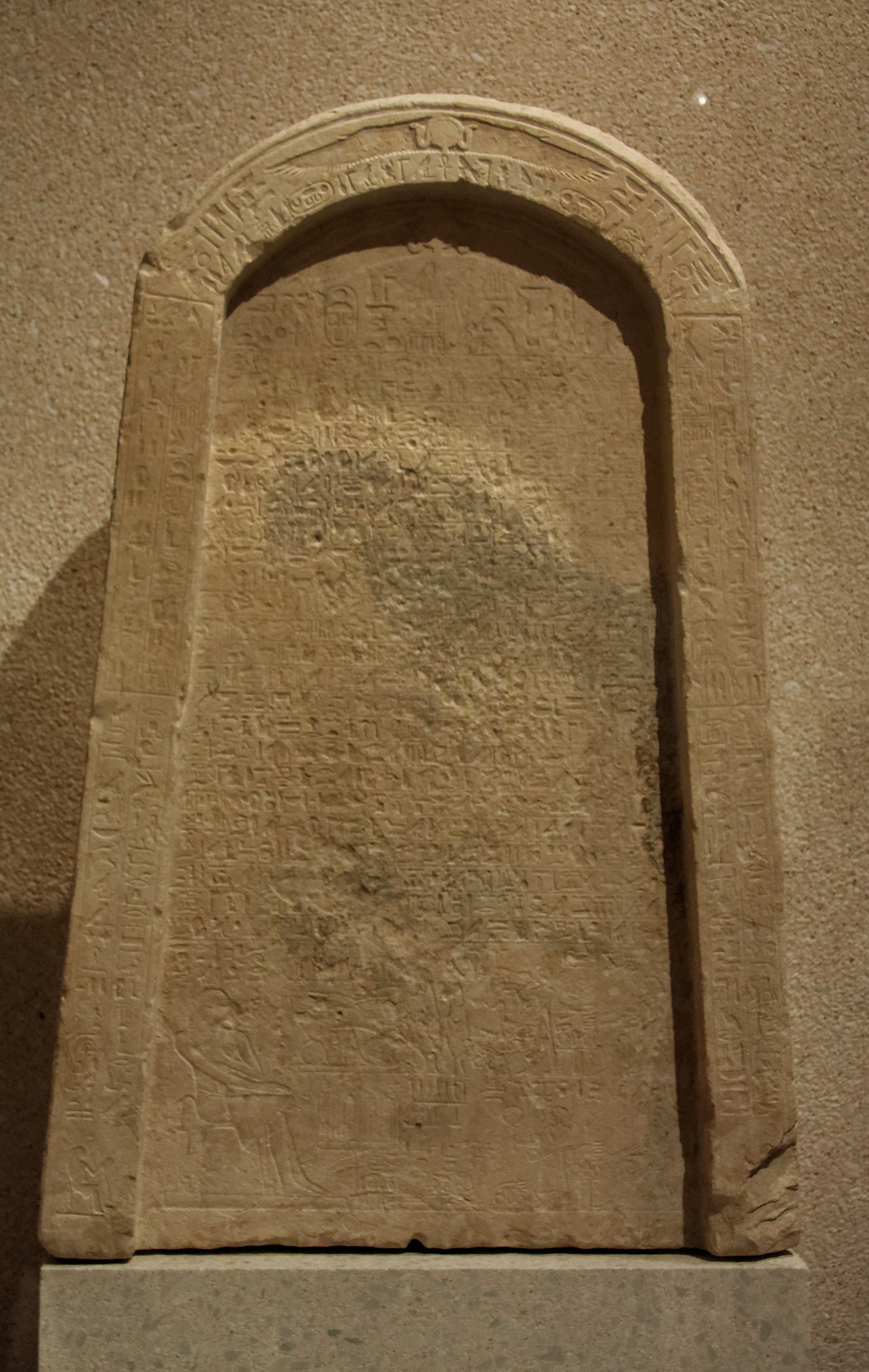
Stele of the treasurer Ikhernofret (Neues Museum, Berlin).

During the Middle Kingdom, the pharaohs Sesostris I , Sesostris III AND Amenemhat I showed great interest in the holy city of Abydos and its temple dedicated to Osiris - Khentymentyou . They sent trusted men there whose mission was to fill the temple with riches, to undertake renovations and above all to lead, by taking an active part, the processions reenacting the mysteries of the martyrdom of Osiris. One of the most important testimonies of this era is the stele of the treasurer Ikhernofret, discovered in Abydos and now exhibited in the Ägyptisches Museum in Berlin .

“I played the exit of the “Opener of the Roads”, when he advances to avenge his father; I drove the enemies from the ship Neshmet, I drove back the enemies of Osiris. I then played a grand exit, accompanying the steps of the god; I allowed his boat to sail, while Thoth directed the navigation rightly. I had equipped the boat [called] “She who appears in glory thanks to Truth-Justice” with a beautiful chapel, and, having fixed her beautiful crowns, here is the god who advances towards Peker, I cleared the path which leads to his tomb facing Peker. I avenged Ounennéfer (= Osiris), on that famous day of the Great Battle, and I destroyed all his enemies on the shore of Nedyt. I made him advance inside the boat (called) “the Great” and that it bore his beauty. I gladdened the hearts of the hills of the western desert, I created exultation in these hills, when "they" saw the beauty of the boat Neshmet, while I landed at Abydos, (the boat) which brought back Osiris, lord of the city, towards his palace. I followed the god into his house, made him purify himself and return to his throne..." —Translation by Claire Lalouette, Stele of Ikhernofret (extract).

The festivities take place in the form of a succession of processions, each of them recalling an episode from the Osirian myth. The senior figures who were brought to participate, although they testified to their presence by placing steles, nevertheless placed their written testimonies under the protection of a pious secret. Several processes have been implemented to guarantee the greatest possible discretion for the “Mysteries of Abydos”. Many writings, including that of Ikhernofret, cite the rites and processions out of order so that they are less understandable. These rituals are, moreover, described at a minimum using stereotypical sentences which in no way reveal the details. Another process is to make a sacred object like the portable boat unrecognizable by camouflaging it under a graphic simplification.

==== Public processions ====
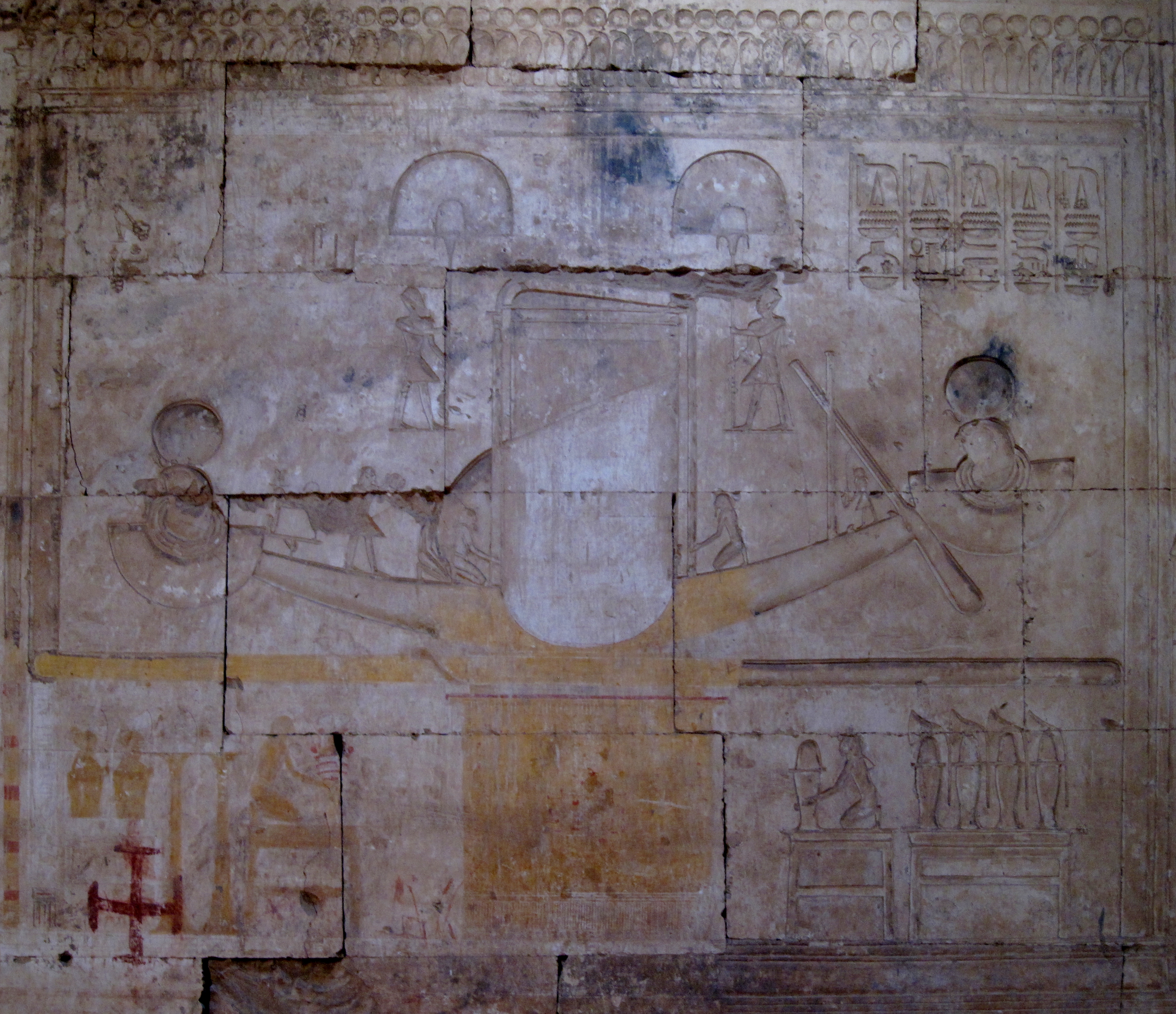
Representation of a processional boat (bas-relief from the funerary temple of Sety I).

The Abydean steles never mention the assassination of Osiris, but this episode was probably played out during the statue's exit from the temple, where attackers, supporters of Set, seized the figure in order to throw it away. on the ground and leave it there, lying on its side. After this tragic episode, the steles mention the processional exit of the péret tepyt, also called “Exit of Wepwawet” or “Exit of Sem”. A high character playing the role of the canine god Wepwawet, the “Opener of Paths”, comes to save his father Osiris by driving away the attackers and performing the rites of mummification on the statue. The canine divinity is here a manifestation of Horus who fights, in the name of his father Osiris, his Setian enemies. The hostile and enemy forces are, perhaps, symbolically crushed during a magical ritual where wax statuettes and vases representing them are mishandled, then destroyed. It was then necessary to carry out the funeral of the statue of Osiris by taking it to its tomb in Ro-Peker. This took place in three stages. During the “Grand Exit” outside the temple, a funeral procession led by Wepwawet was acclaimed by the crowd of faithful. It was then necessary to cross a body of water by boat- undoubtedly the sacred lake of the temple - under the protection of Thoth, to symbolize the passage to the beyond. For the last part of the journey, the god was placed on a funeral sleigh to reach the necropolis, accompanied by a few officiants.

The culminating moment of the mysteries is the implementation of the regeneration of Osiris in the “Abode of Gold”, probably located near the tomb. According to the words of King Neferhotep I of the 13th Dynasty, a new statue was made from gold and electrum. The texts do not, however, specify the time of this rite, which must have taken place during the preparations for the processions or after the funeral of the previous statue. During Haker Night, an officiant was supposed to capture the spirit of Osiris so that the statue could be considered alive and inhabited by the god. This night corresponds, in the funerary cult, to the night of justification, where the judgment of the dead is ritualized during nightly vigils. This accomplished, the news was announced to the living and the dead, in common exultation. The statue then left Ro-Peqer in a sacred boat to reach the temple.

==== Fashioning of Osirian statuettes ====
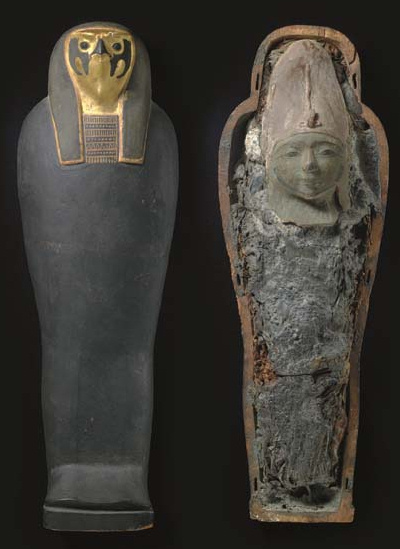
Statuette of a "vegetating Osiris" and its sarcophagus (private collection).

If the processional outings of the “Mysteries of Abydos” in the month of Khoiak took place in public, other rites were performed away from profane eyes by officiants forming a confidential circle. Each year, during the days preceding the processions (or concomitantly), new statues of Osiris were made from a mixture of earth, barley grains and other precious components. The ritual shaping of these divine representations constituted the heart of Abydaean celebrations. The Ikhernofret stele does not provide any information as to the appearance of these statues but specifies, all the same, that they were decorated with gold and precious stones:

I adorned the chest of the statue of the lord of Abydos with lapis lazuli and turquoise, electrum and all kinds of precious stones used to adorn his divine limbs. I adorned the god with his crowns, according to my office as steward of secrets and my function as priest. A sem priest with pure hands, my hands were undefiled to adorn the god. —Stele of Ikhernofret (extract). Translation by Claire Lalouette

None of these statuettes have been discovered at Abydos during archaeological excavations. This description, however, agrees with later artifacts discovered on other sites and known under the scholarly name of “vegetating Osiris” (as know in English: Corn mummy; in German: Kornosiris / Kornmumie ). The latter, around fifty centimeters high, are frequently decorated with gold leaf or placed in small golden sarcophagi with falcon heads.

== Relics of Osiris ==
The ancient Egyptians did not worship relics (body parts or personal belongings) left behind by a saint or hero after death. Like the deities of the pantheon, the veneration of ancestors was preferentially exercised through the mediation of cult statues. The notion of relic is, however, not absent from religion. It is mainly based on the myth of the dismemberment of Osiris by Set. Traditions thus attest to the presence of this or that part of the Osirian body in certain cities of the country. The materiality of these relics was manifested in the annual production of figurines of the body of Osiris and simulacra of relics.

=== Myth of the dismemberment of Osiris ===
==== Commemorating the actions of Isis ====
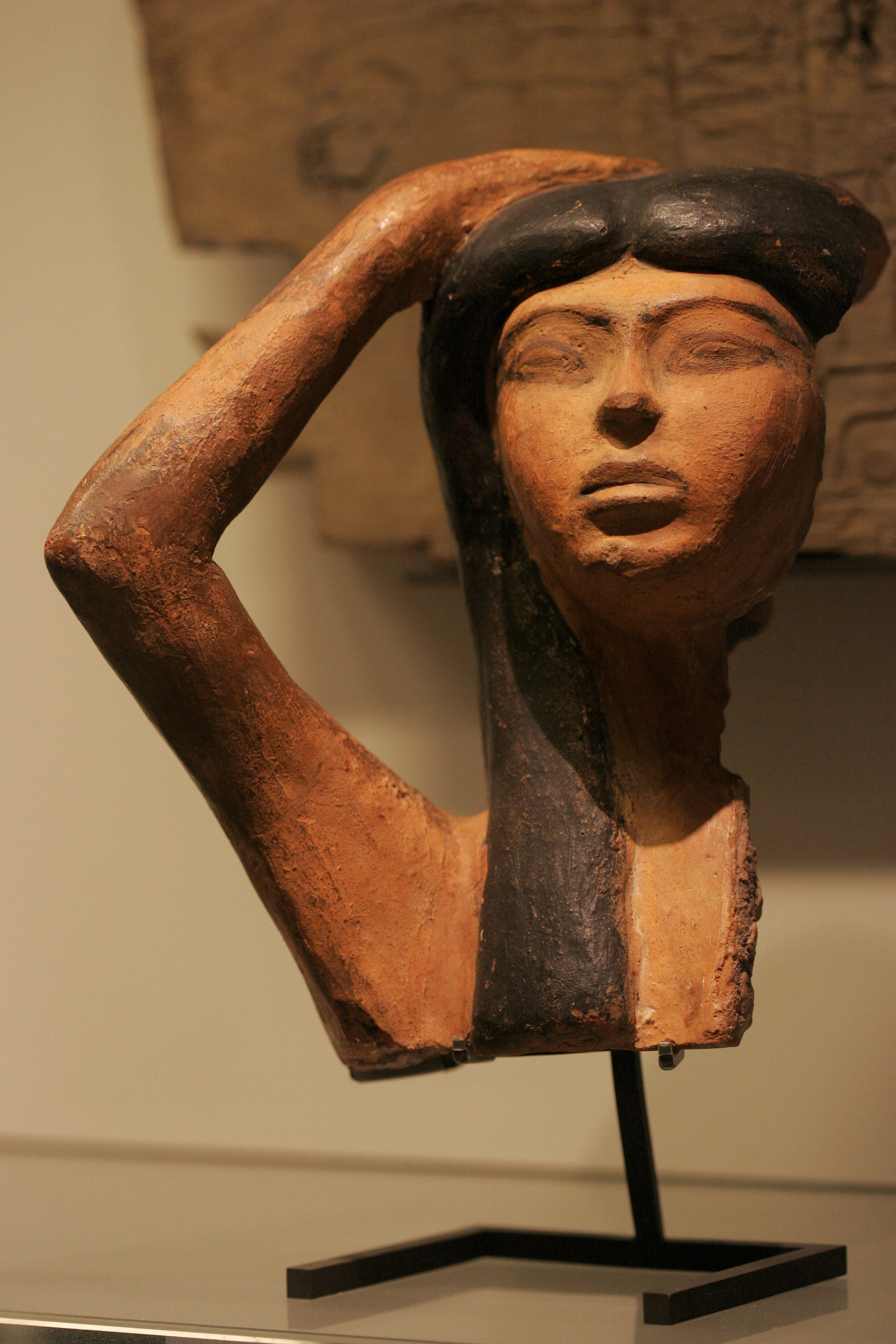
Isis in mourning for Osiris (Musée du Louvre).

The largest part of the “Mysteries of Osiris” ceremonies, performed during the month of Khoiak, took place within temples away from profane eyes. Only the “ Ritual of the Mysteries of Dendera”, engraved on the walls of one of the six Osirian chapels of the temple of Hathor (Greco-Roman period), records the essentials of these ritual gestures. This collection is a late compilation of seven books which explains, in a sometimes confusing manner, the making and burial of three sacred figurines fashioned in the image of the god Osiris. At the turn of the 19th and 20th centuries, scholars such as Alexandre Moret and James George Frazer attributed a purely agrarian character to the rites of the “Mysteries of Osiris” by overinterpreting the text of Dendera. Ptolemaic hieroglyphic writing being difficult to approach, these two commentators, misled by translation errors due to Victor Loret, endowed the “Ritual of the Mysteries” with excessive symbolism which it does not contain. Since the work of Émile Chassinat, in the middle of the 20th century, it is now clearly established that the mysteries are the commemoration of the martyrdom of Osiris: his dismemberment by Set and his funeral after his reconstitution by Isis and Anubis. During the month of Khoiak, the priests reconstituted (or re-enacted), within the temples, the main acts and gestures accomplished by the goddess Isis after the murder of her husband. Thanks to fragile sacred figurines, the priests renewed each year the reconstruction of the dismembered body of Osiris, as well as his sumptuous funeral. The central divinity of the ritual is the goddess Isis, mentioned mainly under her name Chentayt, “She who suffers”, a term which designates the widow. In places, the texts split it by speaking of a “Chentayt of Busiris” and a “Chentayt of Abydos”. This is how the making of the Osirian figurines took place in a room of the temple called the “Residence of Chentayt” in the presence of a statue showing her lamenting.

==== Quest for Isis ====
At the beginning of the 2nd century, the Greek Plutarch reported an Egyptian tradition which placed the institution of the “Mysteries of Osiris” in the mythical times of the divinities:

When [Isis] had stifled the madness of Typhon and put an end to his rage, she did not want so many fights and so many struggles sustained by her, so many wandering races, so many strokes of wisdom and courage remained buried in silence and oblivion. But, through figurations, allegories and representations, she unites with the most holy initiations the memory of the evils she had then endured, thus consecrating at the same time a lesson of piety and encouragement for men and women. who would fall under the influence of such adversities. —Plutarch, On Isis and Osiris,§ 27.Translation by Mario Meunier

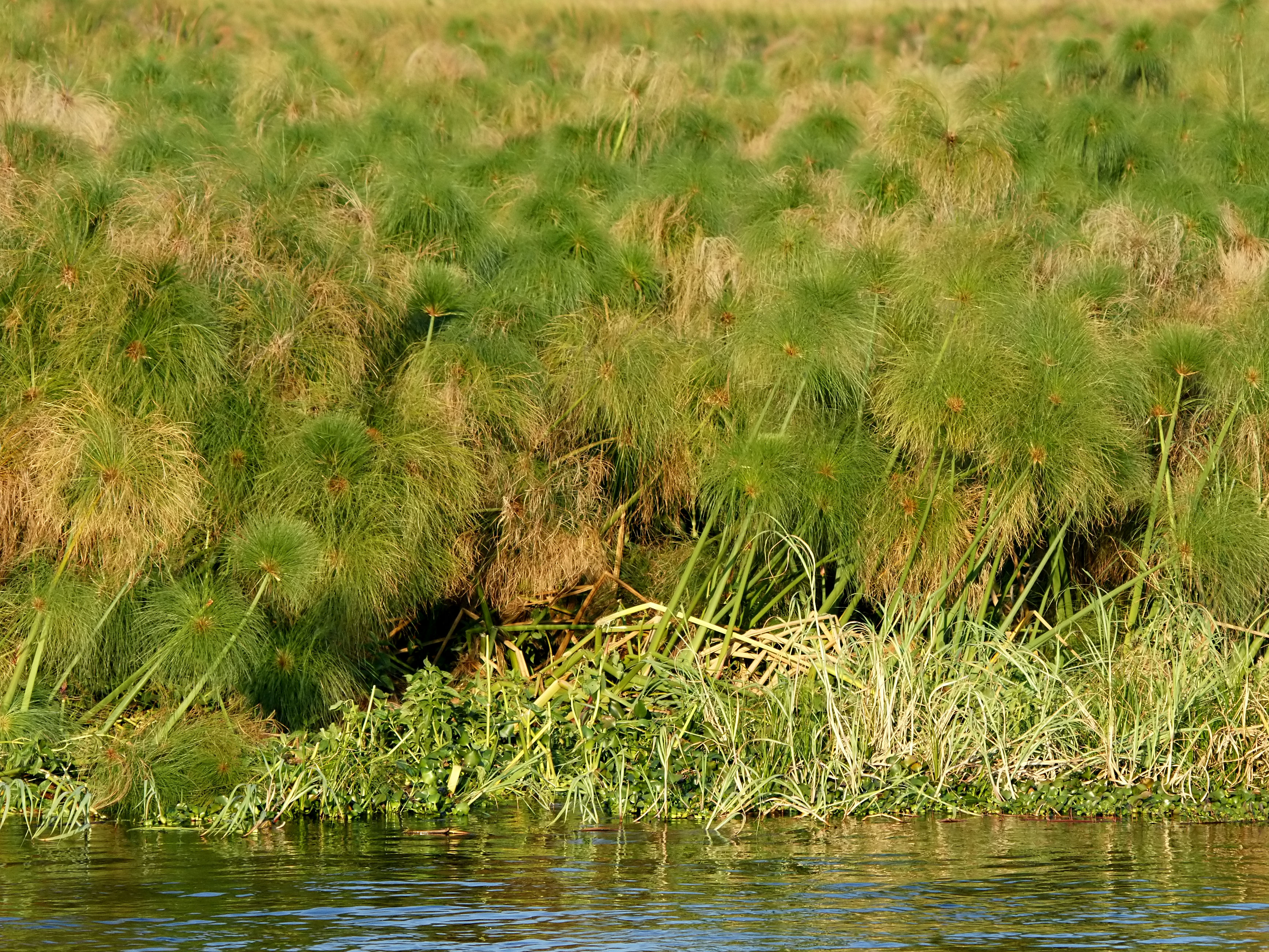
Set scattering the members of Osiris across the Egyptian marshes.

Plutarch offers in his philosophical treatise, On Isis and Osiris, the first narrative version of the Osirian myth, a story only evoked by disparate allusions in Egyptian sources.

While Osiris reigned over the Egyptian people, his jealous brother Set decided to assassinate him in order to ascend the royal throne. During a banquet, Set, helped by seventy-two cronies, succeeded by trickery in locking Osiris in a magnificent chest which he then threw into the waters of the Nile. (Note: We do not know why the Greek Plutarch attributes seventy-two accomplices to Set. Perhaps this figure is a reminder of the complicated birth of Osiris. The Egyptian solar year has 360 days (twelve thirty-day months) and five epagomenal days. Plutarch implies that the lunar and solar calendars originally had the same number of 360 days. When Ra condemned Nut not to give birth to her five children during the 360 days of the year, Thoth delivered his offspring by playing dice with the Moon. He won her 1/72nd of each of her days of light, i.e. five days. With this sum, he formed the five epagomenal days (360 divided by 72) that he placed at the end of the solar year to allow the successive births of Osiris, Isis, Haroeris, Set and Nephthys (Plutarch, On Isis and Osiris, § 12).) The goddess Isis, the wife of Osiris, searched for the body of her husband and this quest brought her to the city of Byblos located in Phoenicia. Isis collected the chest from King Malcander and brought it back to Egypt. From there, the story enters the crucial phase regarding the institution of the Mysteries:

Isis, before setting out to go to her son Horus, who was brought up in Buto, had deposited the chest where Osiris was in a secluded place. But Typhon, one night when he was hunting by moonlight, found him, recognized the body, cut it into fourteen pieces and scattered them on all sides. Informed of what had happened, Isis set out to look for them, boarded a boat made of papyrus and traveled through the marshes. […] This also explains why several tombs in Egypt are said to be the tomb of Osiris, because Isis, it is said, raised a tomb each time she discovered a section of the corpse. —Plutarch, On Isis and Osiris,§ 18. Translation by Mario Meunier

==== Sacred relics ====
The myth of Osiris dismemberment by Set has been attested throughout Egyptian texts since the time of the Pyramid Texts. The sources are, however, disparate and discordant depending on the places and times considered. The number of relics (12, 14, 16, 26 or 42) collected by Isis or Anubis, as well as the distribution of members across the territory, their very nature - body parts or regalia (scepter, crown) - are subject to significant variations. Divergences are sometimes found even within the same source if it is a compilation of varied traditions . As far as we know, the oldest list of relics dates from the New Kingdom and is in the form of a magical formula where the practitioner threatens to reveal the secrets of the tombs of Osiris (Chester Beaty Papyrus VIII). This text cites the cities of Athribis, Heliopolis, Letopolis, Mendes and Heracleopolis and attributes to them a lot of relics which can be up to five for the same city. The Jumilhac Papyrus (Ptolemaic period), which reports traditions limited to the Cynopolitan region (17th and 18th nomes of Upper Egypt), presents two divergent lists of twelve and fourteen relics found across the country thanks to the efforts of Anubis. The temples of Edfu and Dendera present, for their part, the myth of the consolidation of Osiris in the form of a procession of forty-two genies, symbols of the forty-two nomes of the country, bringing the holy relics under the guidance of pharaoh, in order to reunite them.

Summary table of the two Cynopolitan traditions concerning the relics found by Anubis, Isis and Thoth
Discovery Day	Disjointed Limb (Relic)	Place of discovery
19 Khoiak	1 - 2/ Head	1 - 2/ Abydos
20 Khoiak	1 - 2/ Eyes	1/ Eastern Ghebel
21 Khoiak	1 - 2/ Jaws	2/ 3rd of Upper Egypt
22 Khoiak	1/ Neck 2/ arms	1/ Western Ghebel 2/?
23 Khoiak	1/ Heart 2/ Intestines	1/ Athribis 2/ Pithom
24 Khoiak	1/ Intestines 2/ Lungs	1/ Pithom 2/ Béhédet du Delta
25 Khoiak	1/ Lungs 2/ Phallus	1/ Delta marshes 2/ Mendès
26 Khoiak	1/ Jaws 2/ Two legs	1/ in a gejet plant 2/ Iakémet
27 Khoiak	1/ Leg 2/ Fingers	1/ Eastern region 2/ 13th and 14th Nomes of Upper Egypt
28 Khoiak	1/ Phallus 2/ Arm	1/ Middle region 2/ 22nd Nome of Upper Egypt
29 Khoiak	1/ Viscera 2/ Heart	1/? 2/ Athribis you participate
30 Khoiak	1/ Arms 2/ Four canopies	1/? 2/?
, Khoiak	2/ Flagellum	2/ Letopolis
, Khoiak	2/ Heka-scepter	2/ Heliopolis

==== Simulacra of relics ====
When Plutarch speaks of the quest for Isis and the disjointed limbs of Osiris, he accounts for two different explanations. The first, mentioned above, affirms that each member found by Isis is indeed buried in the holy city where it was discovered. The second explanation, however, considers that the tombs contain only simulacra intended to deceive and confuse Set in his destructive madness:

Isis made images of everything she discovered, and she gave them successively to each city, as if she had given the whole body. She thus wanted Osiris to receive as many honors as possible, and for Typhon, if he were to prevail over Horus, to be lost and deceived in his search for the true tomb of Osiris by the diversity of everything that we could show him. The only part of Osiris' body that Isis could not find was the virile member. As soon as it was snatched, Typhon threw it into the river, and the lepidote, (Note: A fish (closely related to the European river barbel), Barbus bynni bynni from its Latin name.) the porgy and the oxyrrhynpus had eaten it: hence the sacred horror that these fish inspire. To replace this member, Isis made an imitation of it, and the Goddess thus consecrated the Phallus, the festival of which the Egyptians still celebrate today. —Plutarch, On Isis and Osiris,18. Translation of Mario Meunier

According to the historian Diodorus Sicily(1st century), the goddess Isis developed a ruse to deceive the priests in order to encourage them to celebrate the memory of Osiris. Each time she found a member, she mummified it by placing it in a human-shaped simulacrum in the likeness of Osiris:

Isis found there all the parts of Osiris' body, except the sexual parts. To hide the tomb of her husband, and have it venerated by all the inhabitants of Egypt, she proceeded in the following manner: she enveloped each part in a figure made of wax and aromatics, and similar in size to Osiris, and summoning all the classes of priests one after the other, she made them swear to the secrecy of the confidence she was going to make to them. She announced to each of the classes that she had entrusted to him, in preference to the others, the burial of Osiris […] —Diodorus of Sicily, Historical Library, I, 21.Translation by Ferdinand Hoefer|

=== Typology of figurines ===
The Ritual of the Mysteries of Osiris (Note: The ancient Egyptians did not give a title to this epigraphic source as a whole. In Egyptological literature, this corpus is known by various names: "Mysteries of Denderah", "Mysteries of Khoiak", "Osirian Mysteries of Denderah", "Ritual of the Mysteries of Osiris in the Month of Khoiak", and so on.) from the temple of Dendera explains the methods of making three figurines which correspond to the statements of Plutarch and Diodorus of Sicily presented above; two simulacra of the entire body, the Khenti-Amentiu and the Seker and a simulacrum of the relic, the “Divine Lamb” which is to be interpreted as the member of Osiris specific to a city.

==== The Khenti-Amentiu ====
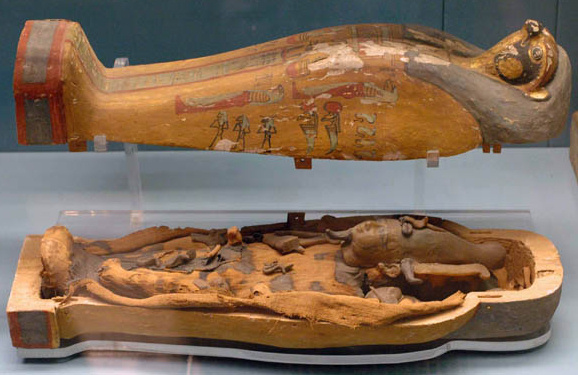
Sacred figurine and its sarcophagus (British Museum, London).

The figurine called Khenti-Amentiu represents Osiris in his aspect as civilizing sovereign, the pharaoh who rescued the Egyptian people from the barbarism of the early ages. It is made from a mold of two gold pieces having the appearance of half a mummy cut from top to bottom. One of the pieces was used to mold the right side of the figurine, the other the left side. The two parts put together, the figurine took the appearance of a mummy with a human face, wearing a white crown. The two pieces of the mold are used as planters in which barley seeds are germinated, in a sandy soil kept moist by daily watering (from Khoiak 12 to 21). The shoots having germinated, the two halves are tied together to give it its final shape. The dimensions of Khenti-Amentiu are modest, in total one cubit high and two palms wide, i.e. 52 × 15 cm (Book II,17). The mold allows the figurine to be named thanks to an inscription engraved on the chest: “King of Upper and Lower Egypt, Pharaoh Seker, loved by the begetter who begat himself” (Book V, 41).

==== The Divine Shred ====
According to the Ritual of the Mysteries of Dendera, the sepy netjer or “divine shred” is of the same composition as the Khenti-Amentiu (barley and sand). It is cast in a square box made up of two symmetrical bronze parts, each measuring 28 cm on a side and 7.4 cm in height. According to Émile Chassinat, the “Lambeau” is undoubtedly the symbolic representation of all the fourteen relics of the body of Osiris. The two figurines of Khenti-Amentiu and “Lambeau” remain together, between Khoiak 12 and 21, in a square greywacke garden vat; it is 65 cm wide and 28 cm deep and pierced at the bottom to allow excess water from daily watering to drain away. The tank rests on four pillars and, under it, is placed a sort of granite basin which collects the excess liquid.

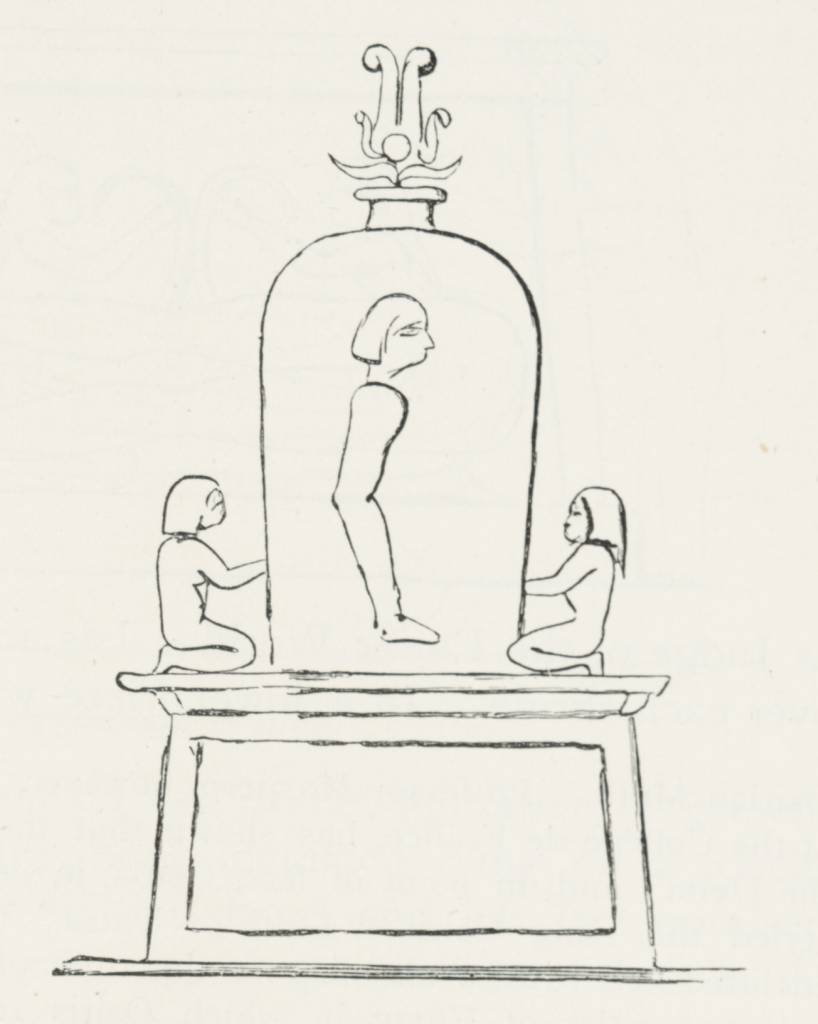
Sketch of the reliquary of the Divine Lambeau (leg of Osiris) based on a relief from the Temple of Philæ.

According to the Belgian Egyptologist Pierre Koemoth, it seems that the “Divine Shred”, as a relic of the dismembered body of Osiris, could be materialized by a plant during the Khoiak ceremonies. The shred was undoubtedly sought by the priests on the banks of the Nile in imitation of the quest for Isis. The Egyptian texts are obscure on this subject, but a passage from the Jumilhac Papyrus seems to mention this fact:

The 26th (of Khoiak), is the day when the jaws ( ougit ) established in a plant ( git ) were found.

An inscription from the Canopic Procession, appearing in the Osireion of Dendera, has Ra Horakhty saying that he discovered the femur of Osiris in the reed beds of the Heliopolis region:

“I bring you the bone ( qes ) of the forearm that I found in the place called “Plants of the Gods and Goddesses,” and I put it in its place in the Golden Room.

Here the relic appears in the form of the reed ( is ), a plant with a stiff stem. This fact is to be linked with Egyptian language expressions such as qes in isy (“reed bones”) which is used to designate the stems of this plant or qes in khet (“tree bones”) to name the branches. The ceremonial of the Inventio Osiridis or “discovery of Osiris”, is well known from the Greco-Egyptian rituals of the Isiac cults. Plutarch reports, certainly for the night of 19 Hathyr, that the believers thought they could find Osiris in the waters of the Nile:

There, the stolists and the priests bring a sacred cist which contains a small golden box into which they pour fresh water. A clamor arose from those present, and everyone shouted that Osiris had just been found. After that, they soak the topsoil with water, mix with it expensive herbs and perfumes, and shape it into a crescent-shaped figurine. They then dress her in a dress […] —Plutarch, On Isis and Osiris, § 39 (excerpt). Translation by Mario Meunier

==== And Seker ====
The Seker (or Sekeris) figurine represents King Osiris in his role as divine ruler and protector of the dead. According to Émile Chassinat, the Seker is the representation of the body of Osiris dismembered by Set and reconstituted by Isis. This figurine is molded from a compact and ductile paste, made of sand and crushed dates, into which other expensive ingredients are also incorporated, including twenty-four precious stones and minerals. The Seker mold is the same length as that of Khenti-Amentiu, namely one cubit (52.5 cm ). However, its appearance is different. One of the parts is used to mold the front side of the body and the other the rear side. Put together, the Seker statuette thus takes the form of a mummy with a human head wearing a nemes, with a uraeus on the forehead, and holding in its two hands the crozier and the whip crossed on the chest (Book III, 32- 33). The Ritual of the Mysteries of Osiris has left us three recipes for the dough used to make it (Book III, 33-35; Book VI, 117-121 and Book VII, 135-144), the last, explained below, is the most detailed.

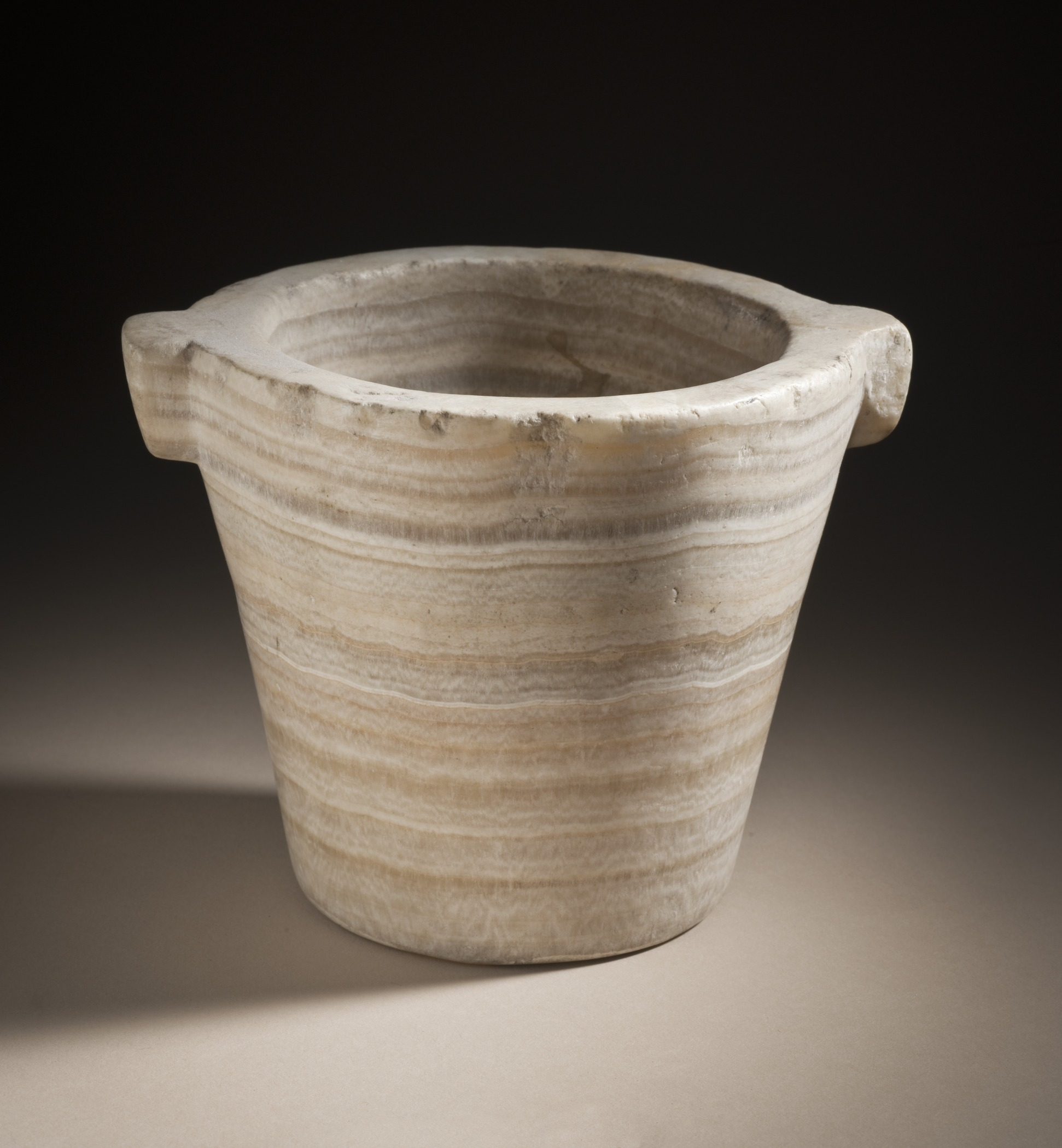
Egyptian mortar (Los Angeles County Museum of Art)

Make a mummy with a human face, wearing a divine wig and the ibes headdress, crowned with the uraeus, grasping the heka scepter and a flabellum, whose name is engraved on a cartouche as follows: “Horus Arbitrator of separation of the Double Country, Osiris lord of Busiris, Onnophris Khentymentyou, god great lord of Abydos”.

Take: Date pulp, earth, seven khait (Note: The khait measure known as the "Place of the Feast of the Digging of the Earth" is a kind of gold container likened to the eye of Osiris (Book V, 59). It contained 1/3 of a hin, i.e. 150 to 151 grams (Chassinat 1966, p. 59-60).) each, 1/3 of hin for each, or by weight three deben, three qites 1/3 for each. (Note: The deben, approximately 91 grams, is divisible into ten qites, i.e. one qite of approximately 9.1 grams. For quantities less than a qite, a fraction of this measure is simply indicated, e.g. 1/3 or, for greater precision, two successive fractions, e.g. 1/4 + 1/8 of a qite.)

Take: Water from the Andjti nome and the sacred lake, two 1/2 hours . Moisten 1/3 of the Khait date pulp .

Work it perfectly and cover it entirely with sycamore branches so that it remains ductile.

Myrrh (kher) of the first quality, four khait 2/3, or by weight of 1/4 of each of them, namely seven qites 1/2 for each.

Fresh turbinth resin packaged in palm fiber, one kait 2/3 1/12, or similarly by weight 1/4 1/8 qite for each.

Sweet aromatics, twelve in total, of which here is the list:

aromatic reed (sebit nedjem): two qites, gaiou aromatic of the oasis: two qites, cinnamon (khet nedjem): two qites, resinous wood of pine Aleppo: two qites, fedou plant: two qites, Ethiopian rush: two qites, djarem aromatic: two qites, peqer aromatic: two qites, mint (nekepet): two qites, pine nuts (perech): two qites, juniper berries (peret in ouân): two qites .

Grind then sift.

Twenty-four minerals, of which here is the list:

gold, silver, carnelian, and still the list: dark red quartz, lapis lazuli, turquoise from Syria, turquoise in pieces, green felspar from the North, calcite, red jasper, tjemehou mineral from the country from Ouaouat, senen mineral, dolerite (nemeh), magnetite, chrysocolla and galena together, green stone in pieces, seheret resin in pieces, amber, black flint (des kem), white flint (des hedj), amethyst from the land of the Blacks.

Grind them and put them in a cup then mix them.

Add the date paste to them: 1/3 khait .

Which makes a total of seventeen kait 1/12.

Here is the summary:

earth: sevenkhait, date pulp: seven khait, myrrh (kher): two khait 1/3, terebinth resin: one khait 2/3, aromatic pleasant smell: one khait 1/6, minerals 1/6 of khait

—Ritual of the Mysteries of Osiris. Translation by Sydney H. Aufrere

== Places of celebrations ==
Scientific knowledge of the “Tombs of Osiris”, where the figurines of the god are permanently buried, has been enriched thanks to French archaeological excavations at Karnak in 1950-51 and since 1993, and those of Hispano-Egypt at Oxyrhynchus since 2000. D Other sites are attested by archaeology, such as the city of Coptos.

=== Holy cities ===
==== Sixteen cities ====
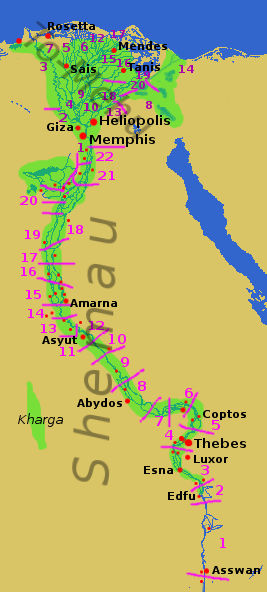
Map of Egyptian nomes.

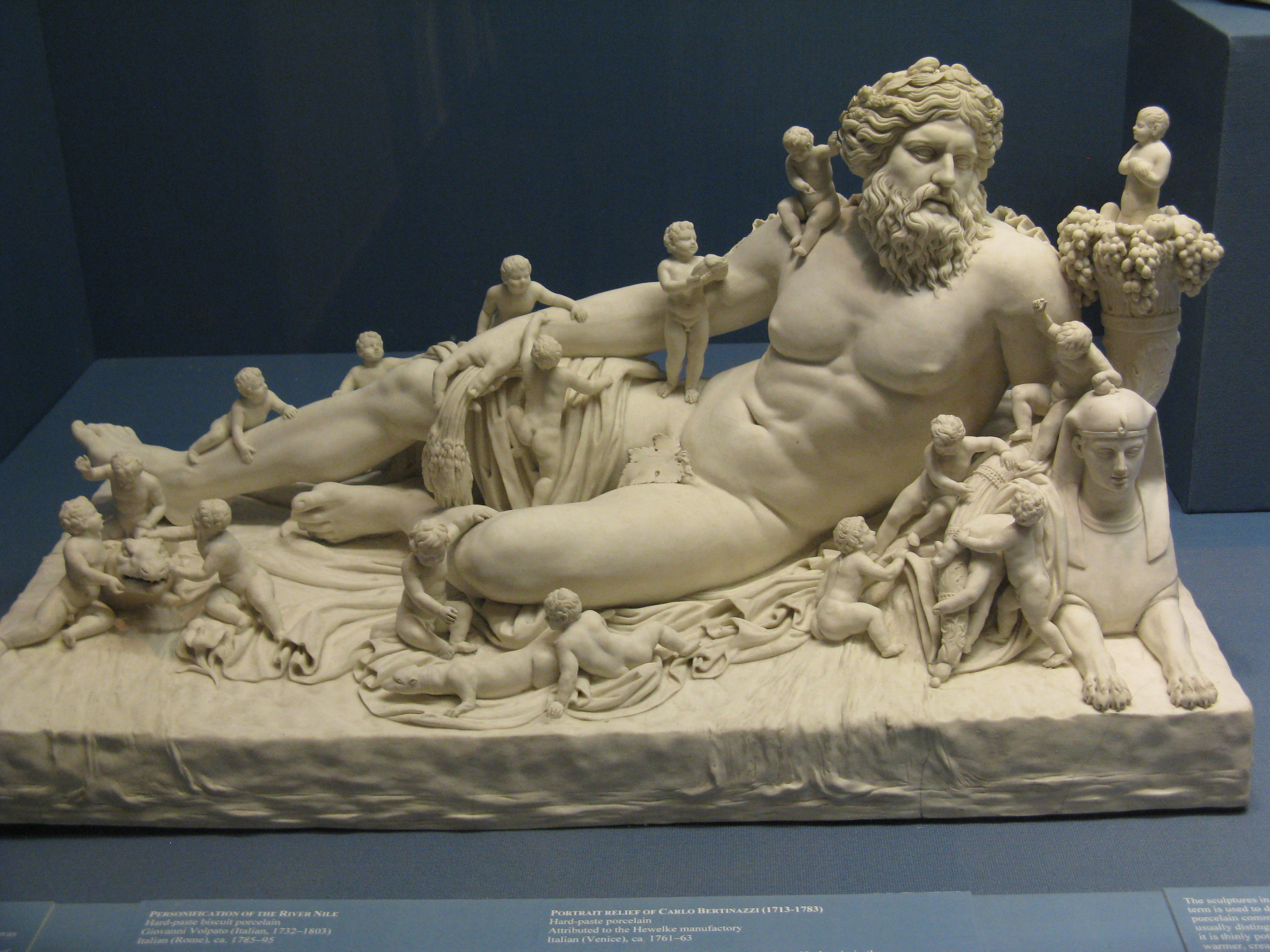
According to the Ritual of the Mysteries of Osiris, the Osirian festivals of the month of Khoiak are celebrated "in all the nomes of the sixteen members of the god and in the divine nomes" (Book I, 14), or "in all the nomes of Osiris" (Book VI, 100), that is to say the sixteen Egyptian provinces where, according to the myth, the shreds of the body of Osiris torn to pieces by Set have been preserved since the quest for Isis . This number is symbolic; Pliny the Elder reports that the flood of the Nile varies depending on the year from one to sixteen cubits in height, sixteen being the optimal number to hope for good harvests after the withdrawal of the waters. (Note: Allegory of the Nile. In Roman statuary, the god Neilos, personification of the Nile, is shown reclining and surrounded by sixteen cherubs representing the sixteen cubits of the flood, cf. Corteggiani 2007, p. 364.) The number sixteen marks a desire to limit ourselves to the most prestigious cities. But, with the development of the cult of Osiris during the first millennium BC, all the regional sanctuaries rallied to the cult of Osiris and integrated the rituals of Khoiak into their cult traditions, as evidenced by the Osireion ofDendera, built on the terrace of the temple of Hathor, or the Osireion of Thebes, built in the Precinct of Amun-Re at Karnak.

==== Local rites ====
The Dendera text gives a general overview of the Osirian mysteries, but provides very little information on the local particularities of these celebrations. Of the twenty cities mentioned, the collection nevertheless identifies two groups of distinct rituals. The first geographical group followed the rites of Abydos and brought together cities of Upper and Lower Egypt such as Elephantine, Coptos, Cusæ, Heracleopolis, Letopolis, the 4th nome of Lower Egypt, Bubastis, Heliopolis and Athribis. The second, more modest, included the towns of Busiris and Memphis.

Some cities did not follow the general rule. In Saïs, the Khenymentiou figurine was not made from a mixture of earth and barley, but modeled by a sculptor from clay mixed with terebinth resin and sprinkled with barley grains (Book II,30-31). In Diospolis, the “divine shred” was replaced by a representation made from bread flavored with herbs (Book I,6-7).

=== Bousiris ===
The site of Bousiris, located in the Nile Delta, has yielded very few archaeological elements. According to indications provided by the Ritual of the Mysteries of Osiris, the tomb of Osiris at Bousiris was in the form of a chapel sheltered under a sacred tree (Douât superior) and a crypt located under a tumulus (lower duat).

==== Upper duât ====
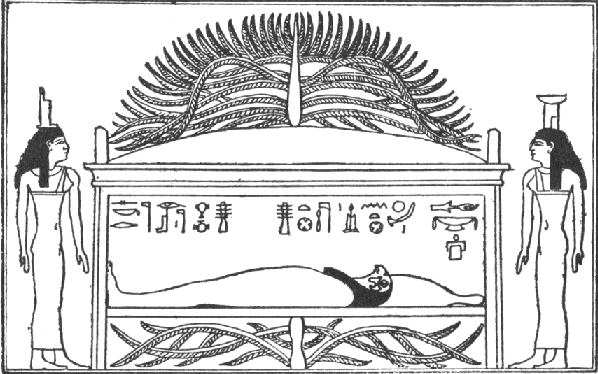
Figurine of Osiris-Seker in the tree (from a tynthirite bas-relief).

From the twenty-fourth of Khoiak and during the last seven days of the month, the sacred effigies of the previous year rest in a place called “Upper Duat”. It is perhaps a sort of chapel-tomb located next to a sacred tree and which then served as a temporary burial place awaiting the thirtieth of Khoiak, the day of the last ceremonies. During this week, the Seker-Osiris figurine is known as “Unique in the Acacia”. A bas-relief from the Osireion of Dendera shows the figurine in its sarcophagus, lying in a tree. The branches spread above and below the pseudo-mummy, all around the coffin, undoubtedly to make it clear that Osiris is placed under the protection of this tree. This figuration recalls the mythical episode reported by Plutarch where, in Byblos, a tamarisk tree had greatly activated its growth in order to hide, inside its wood, the sarcophagus containing the remains of Osiris (Plutarch, On Isis and Osiris, §15. Translation by Mario Meunier).

==== Lower duat ====
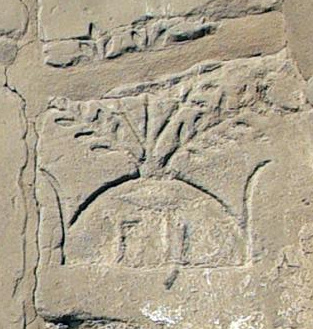
Schematic representation of the Sacred Mound of Osiris (Karnak).

The Ritual of the Mysteries of Osiris indicates that the sacred figurine of the previous year is definitively buried during the night of the thirtieth Khoiak in a place called “Lower Duat”. In the town of Busiris, this is a crypt located under a sacred mound planted with one or more ished trees, probably balanites:

As for the crypt of the ished tree which is in the divine cemetery, one enters it with the mystical work of the previous year; this is what we call the lower Duat. It is made of stone. Its height is sixteen cubits; its width twelve cubits. It has seven doors similar to the Douat door. There is a door to the west through which one enters, a door to the east through which one exits. It contains a pile of sand of seven cubits, on which the god is placed inside the sarcophagus. —Ritual of the mysteries of Osiris, Book V, 80-82. Translation by Émile Chassinat.

According to the description given in the ritual text, the Busirite crypt was a stone building covered by an artificial hill. The ground level had to be lower than that of the entrance in order to allow the stagnation of water during the flooding of the Nile during the month of Khoiak during which the burial took place. The mound of sand was undoubtedly intended to keep the small sarcophagus of figurine above ground.

=== Abydos ===
==== Ou-Peker ====
( Geographic coordinates: 26.1751°N 31.909°E )

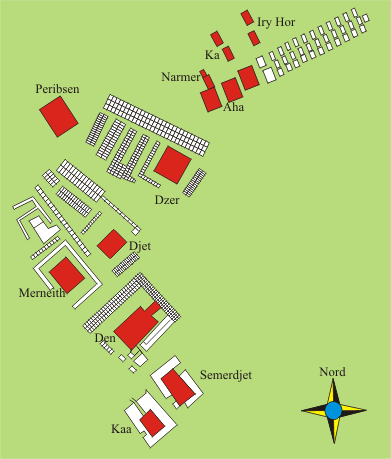
Map of the Umm el-Qa'ab necropolis.

Since the archaeological excavations of Émile Amélineau in 1897, it is generally accepted that the site of Ou-Peker is to be located in Umm El Qa'ab on the site of the former royal necropolis of the Thinite sovereigns. In this cemetery built at the foot of the mountains of the Libyan desert, the ancient Egyptians assimilated the tomb of King Djer of the 1st dynasty to the Areq-heh, the Abydean tomb of Osiris. A processional route, or perhaps a canal, connected the temple of Osiris to this tomb. On numerous stelae, the deceased declare that they wish to pass through the site of Ou-Peker in order to receive, during the days of Khoiak, a crown of justification. This crown offered by Osiris is a symbol of legitimacy and eternity. It had to be woven from branches taken from the trees that grew along the sacred path, probably date palms . According to demotic sources, the soul (ba) of Osiris fluttered under these trees and received food placed on 365 offering tables. This orchard also housed a vineyard in order to provide wine for the daily libations poured on the altars. In 1952, the German Egyptologist Günther Roeder proposed comparing the garden vat (hezepet), where germination takes place, to the figurines of the “sacred domain” (hezep) of Abydos where flowers, vines and vegetables grew dedicated to Osiris. During the Late Period, the garden vat of the Mysteries would then have symbolically reflected the domain of Ou-Peqer by constituting, within the different temples, a reduced form of the Osirian agricultural domain.

==== Osireion of Abydos ====
( Geographic coordinates: 26.1842°N 31.9185°E )

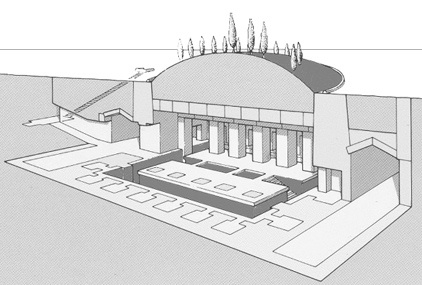
Sectional view of the Osireion at Abydos

The Osiréion of Abydos, discovered in 1903, is an unrivaled construction, built by Seti I at the rear of his funerary temple. With its Egyptian name "Beneficent is Menmaâtre to Osiris", the building is dedicated to Osiris and presents itself as a cenotaph whose history and meaning are still debated. However, it seems to reproduce the tomb of Osiris as the ancient Egyptians imagined it. Today gutted, only the underground parts remain. Originally, the main room was supposed to support, above it, an artificial earthen mound (tumulus) planted with one or more sacred trees. The Osireion is massive, with the aim of imitating the archaic appearance of the temples of the early Old Kingdom. However, it takes up the plans of the royal hypogeums of the New Kingdom, all characterized by a long hallway leading to a series of funerary chambers. The central space evokes an island surrounded by a canal. This island represents the primordial mound surrounded by the waters of the Noun, on which Atum-Re, the creative solar god, appeared. The axis of the island is marked to the east and west by two staircases plunging into the canal. In the center are dug two rectangular cavities whose purpose was, perhaps, to accommodate a simulacrum of a sarcophagus and a chest of canopic vases. If this is the case, it is not impossible to imagine that Osiréion housed within it an Osirian figurine created during the Mysteries and renewed each year.

=== Osireion of Karnak ===
The Osireion site of Karnak (Thebes) allows us to follow the evolution of the ritual of burial of sacred figurines over nearly a millennium, from the New Kingdom to the Lagid period. This Osirian complex is located inside the enclosure of Amun-Re, behind the main temple dedicated to the demiurge Amun . It is made up of the tomb itself, the first traces of which date back to the end of the New Kingdom, as well as several chapels built from the 22nd dynasty, dedicated to particular forms of the god, "Coptite Osiris", "Osiris Ounennefer at the heart of the tree (iched)”, “Osiris sovereign of eternity”, etc. The Osirian tomb of Karnak is marked by three successive phases, the architecture tending to become more complicated over time.

At the end of the New Kingdom, the figurines were buried in small individual mudbrick tombs. These miniature structures are juxtaposed or superimposed on each other, without any coherent order.

During the Saite Period and the Late Period, the system of miniature tombs continued, but they were installed inside a construction made up of vaulted chambers built against each other, as they were filled. The era of this architectural system is dated by bricks stamped with the name of Nékao II, a pharaoh from the end of the 7th century BC. Fragile fragments of plaster figurines were discovered inside. These effigies take the form of mummified Osiris. This tomb must have been partially buried, but the two largest vaulted chambers were accessible through two small arched doors. The whole thing had to be covered by an artificial mound planted with one or more trees.

Remains of the Theban Osireion (Saite tomb)

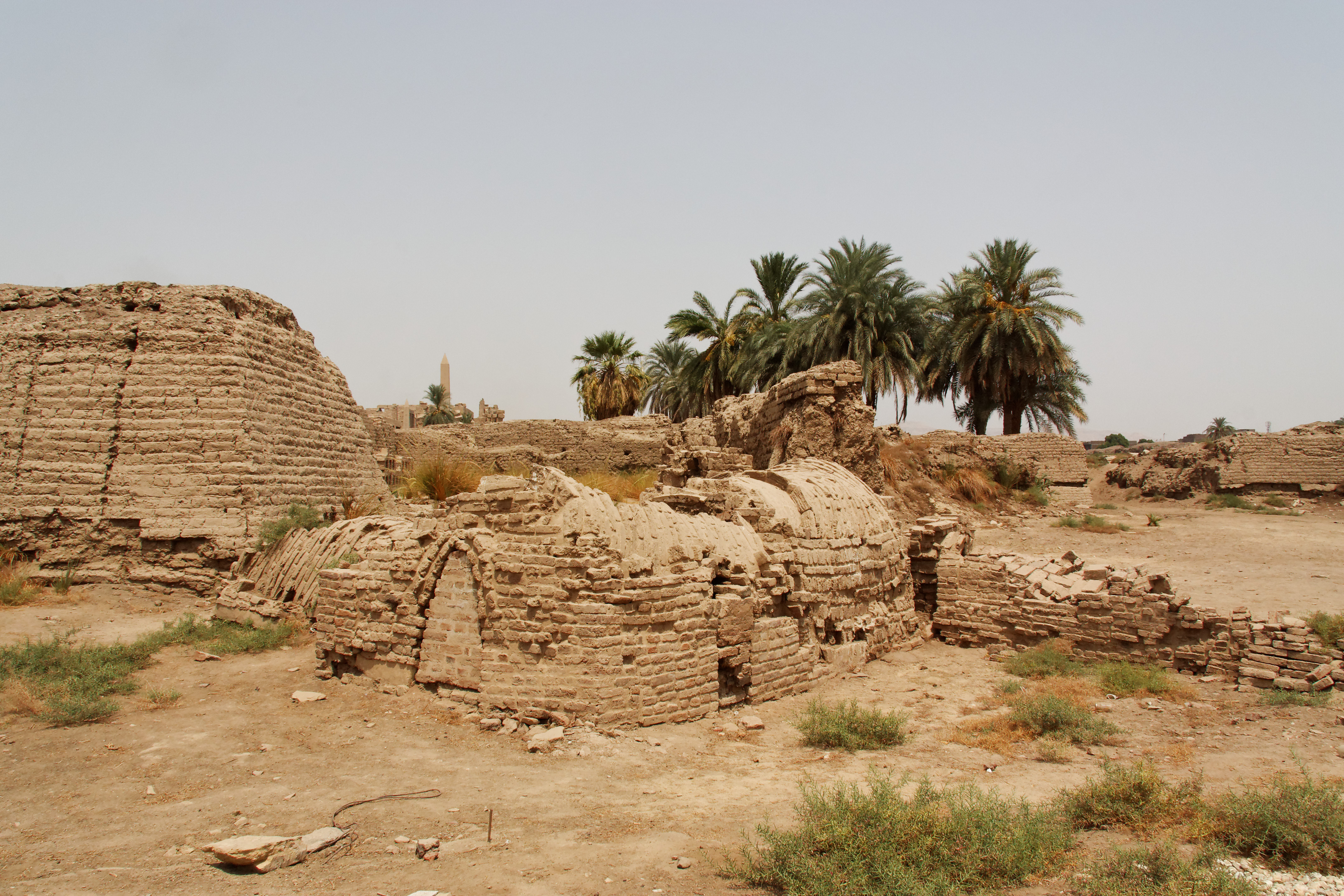
Vaulted chambers of the Osirian tomb.

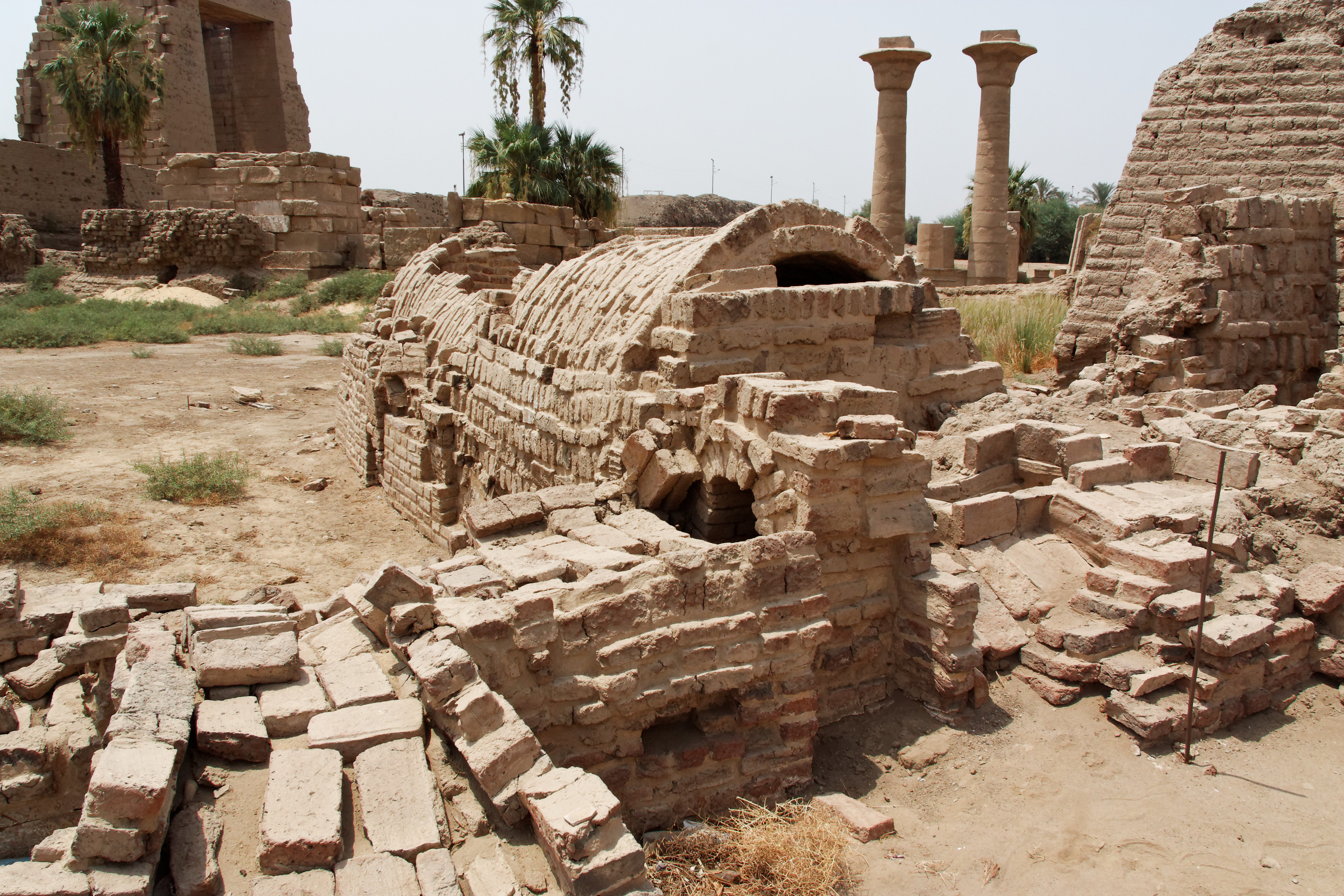
Close-up of the tomb.

Under the reign of Ptolemy IV, a building was built which took the form of vast catacombs with a rational organization. The tomb is organized around three vaulted galleries, each of which includes miniature vaults (a sort of wall niches) spread over four levels. The capacity of these catacombs is estimated at a total of 720 vaults.

Remains of the Theban Osireion (Ptolemaic catacombs)

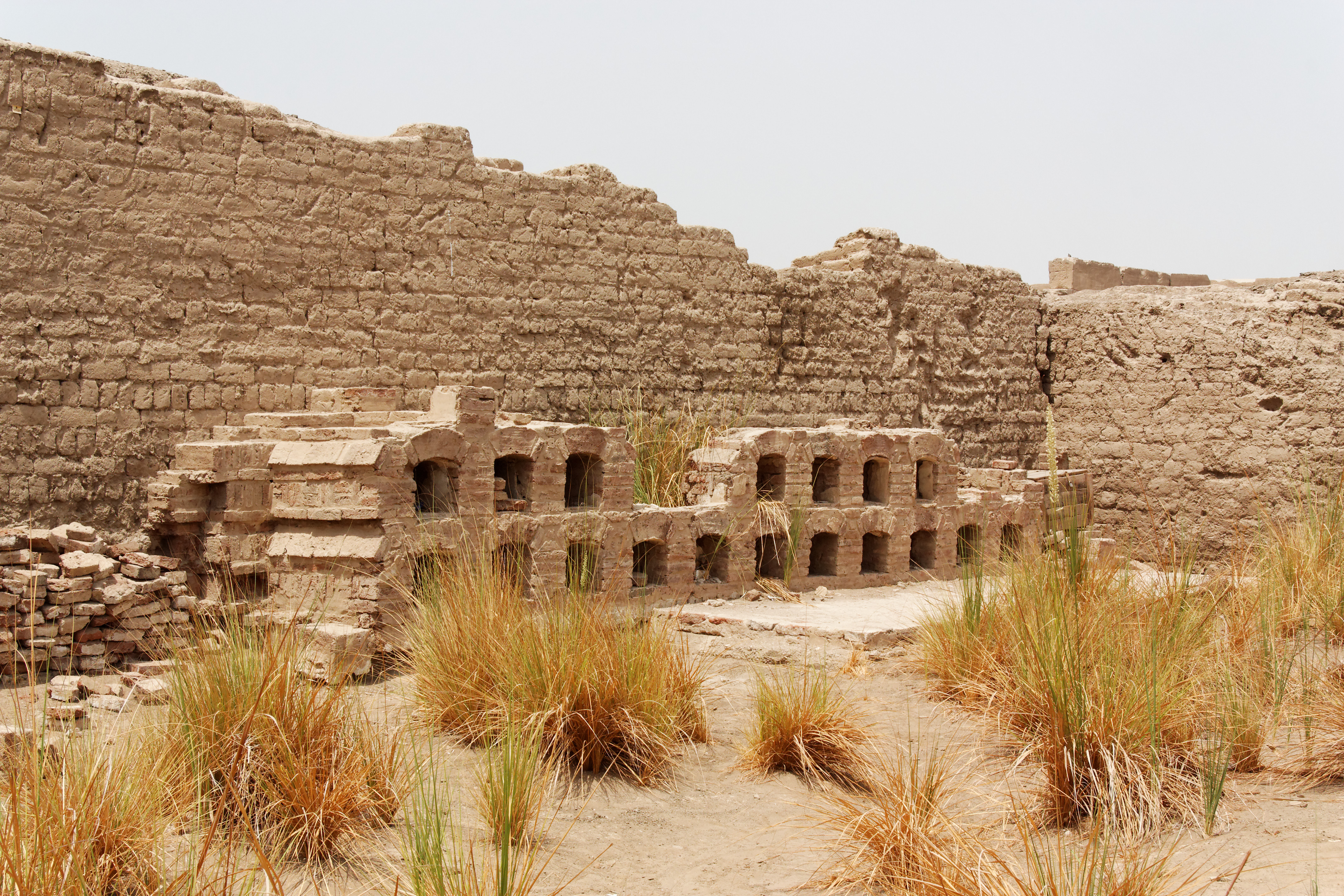
View of the remaining niches in the catacombs of Ptolemy IV.

=== Oxyrhynchos ===
Located in the ancient 19th century of Upper Egypt, the city of Oxyrhynchus (Oxyrhynchos) (in Egyptian Per-Madjaj, in Coptic Pemdjé, in Arabic El-Bahnasa ) is rich in remains dating from the Pharaonic and Greco-Roman eras . Since the years 2000-2001, a Hispano-Egyptian mission has endeavored to excavate the site of the local Osiréion, known by the Egyptian name of Per-Khef. The sanctuary appears as a 3.50 meter high mound isolated in the desert. On the surface, all that remains is a leveled, square structure, fifteen meters on a side. A brick surrounding wall demarcated a rectangular sacred space 165 meters long by 105 meters wide, where a small sacred lake had been dug in the northern corner.

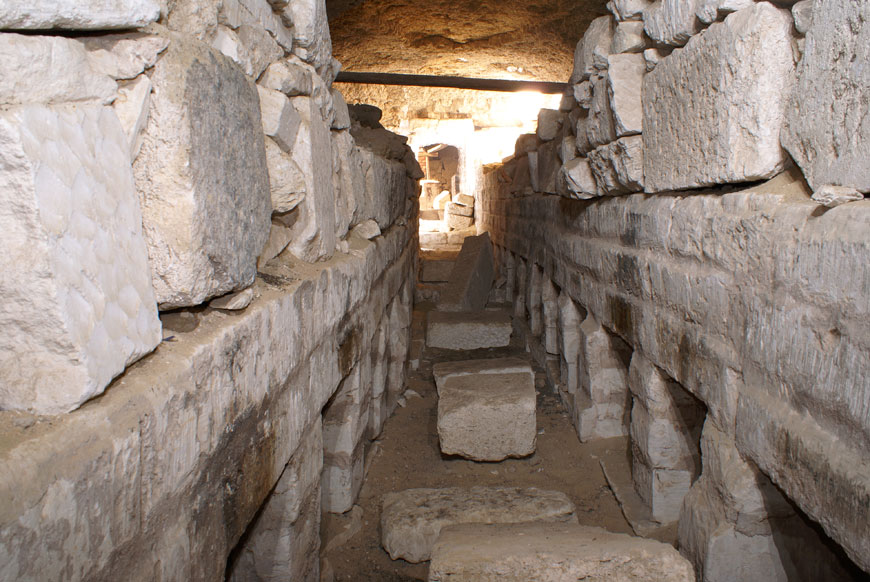
Underground gallery in the Osireion of Oxyrhynchos, punctuated by sepulchral niches for the burial of sacred figures.

The underground structures of the sanctuary were dug into the rock of the Jebel. They are accessible by three staircases including a main staircase which opens into a vestibule. The latter leads to two rooms about ten meters long. The first was found empty. In the second, there lay a large limestone statue of Osiris, made to be lying down because, with its 3.50 meters high, it would not have been able to stand erect under the vault. From this room two long galleries run east-west. These corridors were dug into the rock and their walls were masoned with blocks of white limestone imported from another locality. The north and south walls are punctuated with symmetrical niches of the same size. As the site was looted, the sacred figurines were no longer in their niches, but were broken and scattered in the rubble. Only one was found intact in its individual tomb; it was molded from silt mixed with bitumen and barley grains. It was then wrapped in linen strips. The broken figurines differ in size and appearance, some are ithyphallic, others, smaller, are sheathed in yellow stucco with a fishnet painted on the body. It seems that each figurine benefited from a funerary trousseau composed of the four children of Horus (molded figurines), a miniature offering table, fruit offerings and protective amulets, pellets or cones, dedicated to dangerous goddesses. Above each niche is an inscription giving the year of burial with mentions of Ptolemaic kings. Gathering all the archaeological data, we know that the sanctuary was used from the 26th Dynasty until the reign of the Roman Emperor Hadrian.

=== Coptos ===
In 1904, a pink granite tank was released by chance by workers during digging on the site of ancient Qift. Since then, the vat has been kept at the Egyptian Museum in Cairo where it is exhibited (reference no. JE37516). The dimensions of this artifact and the texts engraved on it show that it is a large garden vat intended for the ritual manufacture of an Osirian figurine during the month of Khoiak. This object constitutes a testimony to the worship paid by the priests of Coptos around 850 BC to Osiris. A scene from the setting shows the Theban pharaoh Harsiesi A (22nd dynasty) offering earth and barley to Osiris-Khentymentyou and Chentayt of Abydos. In another scene his son, Prince Amonrasonter, is shown performing incenses and lustrations before Osiris-Khentymentyou and Chentayt of Bousiris. The text is very degraded in places but it seems to be taken from a ritual specific to the town of Bousiris where, from the twelve to the twenty-fourth Khoiak, barley was ceremonially germinated. In 1977, these texts were examined by Jean Yoyotte. From certain graphic uses, it appears that this ritual basin preserves texts composed before the New Kingdom, a time when the gods Osiris and Sekeris were not yet assimilated. Among the texts are two poems where the goddess Chentayt is much closer to Hathor than to Isis, another proof of the antiquity of the composition.

== Calendar of Mysteries for the month of Khoiak ==
The Ritual of the Mysteries of Osiris, preserved by the temple of Dendera, is more of an archive, a witness to the rites, than a true calendar of Khoiak ceremonies. The indications provided contradict each other, intersect and appear different from one holy city to another. It is likely that certain acts are passed over in silence, because certain days are not even mentioned, such as the 13th, 17th, 26th, 27th, 28th and 29th of the month. It is therefore quite difficult to draw up a complete and rigorous chronological order of operations. Despite these difficulties, certain facts appear clearly established .

=== Khoiak 12 Day ===
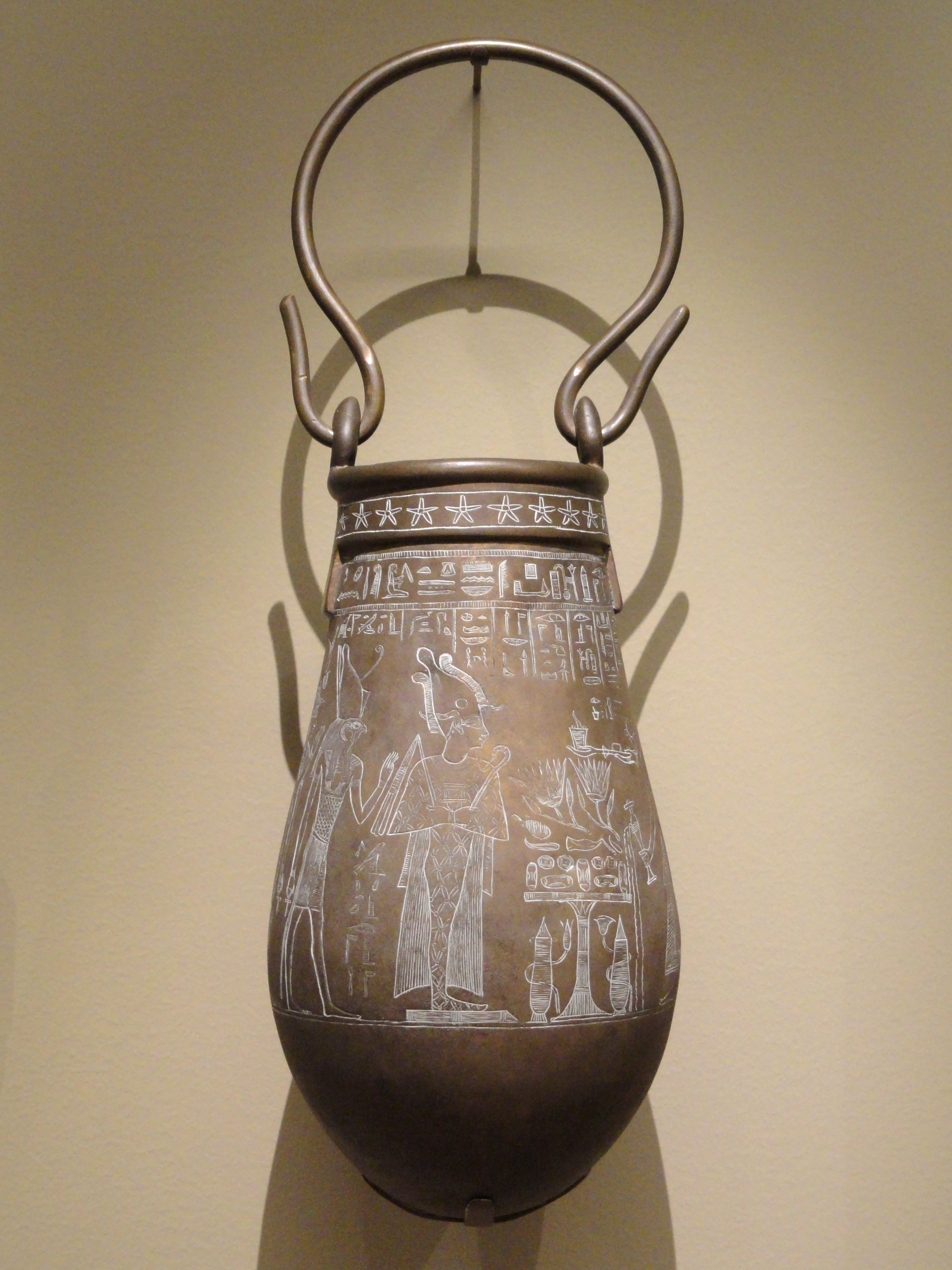
Egyptian situla from the Ptolemaic period (Cleveland Museum of Art).

The Mysteries dedicated to the god Osiris begin on Khoiak 12 and last nineteen days until the end of the month. In several places in the Denderah text the celebration takes the name of festival (deni) (also known as “Quarter Moon Festival”), the rituals are therefore compared with the lunar phase; the festival (deni) being moreover the seventh day of each lunar month. At the fourth hour of day, (Note: The ancient Egyptians divided the day into twenty-four hours, twelve for the night and twelve for the day. The first hour of the day invariably began at sunrise, and the first hour of the night at sunset. The end of the sixth hour of the Egyptian day is our noon, when the sun is highest in the sky (culmination) and the shadow of an object is shortest. Time was measured by solar clocks during the day and by clepsydra at night. On the measurement of time in ancient Egypt and the calendar system as a whole (years, months, hours, decans and zodiac), read Anne-Sophie von Bomhard, Le Calendrier Égyptien, une Œuvre d'Éternité, London, Éditions Périplus, 1999, 104 p..) the officiants prepare barley and sand intended to form the figurines of the Kentymentiou and the “Divine Lambeau”. After being measured, the ingredients are mixed and placed in gold molds. Everything is placed in a garden tank, between two layers of rushes. The mixture of soil and barley is watered every day until Khoiak 21 to allow the seeds to germinate.

“As for what is done in Busiris, it is carried out on the twelfth Khoiak, in the presence of Chentayt who takes his place in Busiris, with barley, 1 hin, (Note: The hin or henu is a measure of capacity used for liquids such as water or beer, equivalent to 0.48 litres (about two glasses of water). Our text indicates that the hin used during the Khoiak rites was a special measure corresponding to the weight of five deben (one deben = 90 or 91 grams), i.e. a hin of 450 to 455 grams. See Ancient Egyptian units of measurement.) and sand, four hin, by means of a golden situla, next to Chentayt, reciting over it the formulas of “Pour water on the humors”. The protective gods of the garden tank protect it until the 21st of Khoiak comes.” — Ritual of the Mysteries, Book II, col. 19-20. Translation by Émile Chassinat reviewed by Sylvie Cauville.

=== Day of Khoiak 12 or 14 ===
The twelve Khoiak, at the third hour of the day (Book VI, 116) or two days later, the fourteenth (Book III, 35 and Book V, 88-89), begins the preparation of the sacred dough used to make the figurine from Seker. (Note: According to Émile Chassinat, it is possible that the text has been altered and that the date of twelve Khoiak is more correct than that of fourteen. See Chassinat 1966, p. 306-308.) Priests, disguised as Anubis and under the patronage of a statue of Chentayt (Isis), weigh and mix the various ingredients prescribed by the texts. The collection sets out three recipes (Book III, 33-35; Book VI, 117-121 and Book VII, 135-144). The base of the preparation consists of earth, date pulp, myrrh, incense, herbs, pulverized precious stones and water drawn from the sacred lake of the temple. These materials are worked to give everything the shape of an egg. This ball is then covered with sycamore branches so that it remains ductile and humid. It is placed in a silver vase until the sixteenth of the month.

“As for the fourteenth of Khoiak, a great processional festival in the Athribite nome, in the city called Iriheb, the contents of the mold of Seker are made on this day with the contents of the venerable vase, which is why the mummy is called composite mummy. This compound of this god is started by the swaddler in the athribite nome on this day. There are four priests for this in Busiris, in the Sanctuary of Chentayt, they are four gods of the embalming workshop of Heliopolis. — Ritual of the mysteries, Book V, col. 88-89. Translation by Émile Chassinat reviewed by Sylvie Cauville.

=== Khoiak Fifteenth Day ===
On the fifteenth of Khoiak, the decoration of the neb ânkh ("master of life") sarcophagus intended for the Seker figurine of the previous year which had been kept in a room of the temple during the past year is carried out. At the end of the month, this figurine is permanently buried in a necropolis. The coffin is made of sycamore wood, one cubit two palms long (67.20 cm) by three palms two fingers wide (26.30 cm). It takes the form of a mummy with a human head, arms crossed on the chest and holding the crook and the whip. An inscription is engraved and painted in a dark green color to indicate the royal title of Osiris: “The Horus who stops the massacre in the Two Lands, king of Upper and Lower Egypt, Osiris, master of Busiris, he who presides over the West, great god, master of Abydos, master of the sky, of the earth, of the infernal world, of water, of the mountains, of the whole orb of the sun” (Book V, 42- 43).

“We bring the sarcophagus; divine matter is applied to it for dyeing; we make our eyes with colors and our hair with lapis lazuli. — Ritual of the Mysteries, Book VII, col. 146. Translation of Émile Chassinat reviewed by Sylvie Cauville.

While the Seker figurine is being cast, another coffin is being made, in Cedrus wood, where it will be placed on the twenty-fourth Khoiak. The same day, the preparation of mereh shepes (“the venerable ointment”) begins, which requires cooking between the eighteenth and twenty-second of the month: “On the 15th day, mix the ointment; the 18th ^{,} cook; the 19th ^{,} cook; on the 20th, cook; the 21st ^{,} cook; on the 22nd, remove it from the fire. The Denderah collection only gives this ointment its main ingredient, asphalt. The other substances are, however, known thanks to an inscription from the temple of Edfu: pitch, lotus essence, incense, wax, terebinth resin and aromatics.

=== Sixteenth Khoiak Day ===
==== First procession of the Opening of the Sanctuary ====
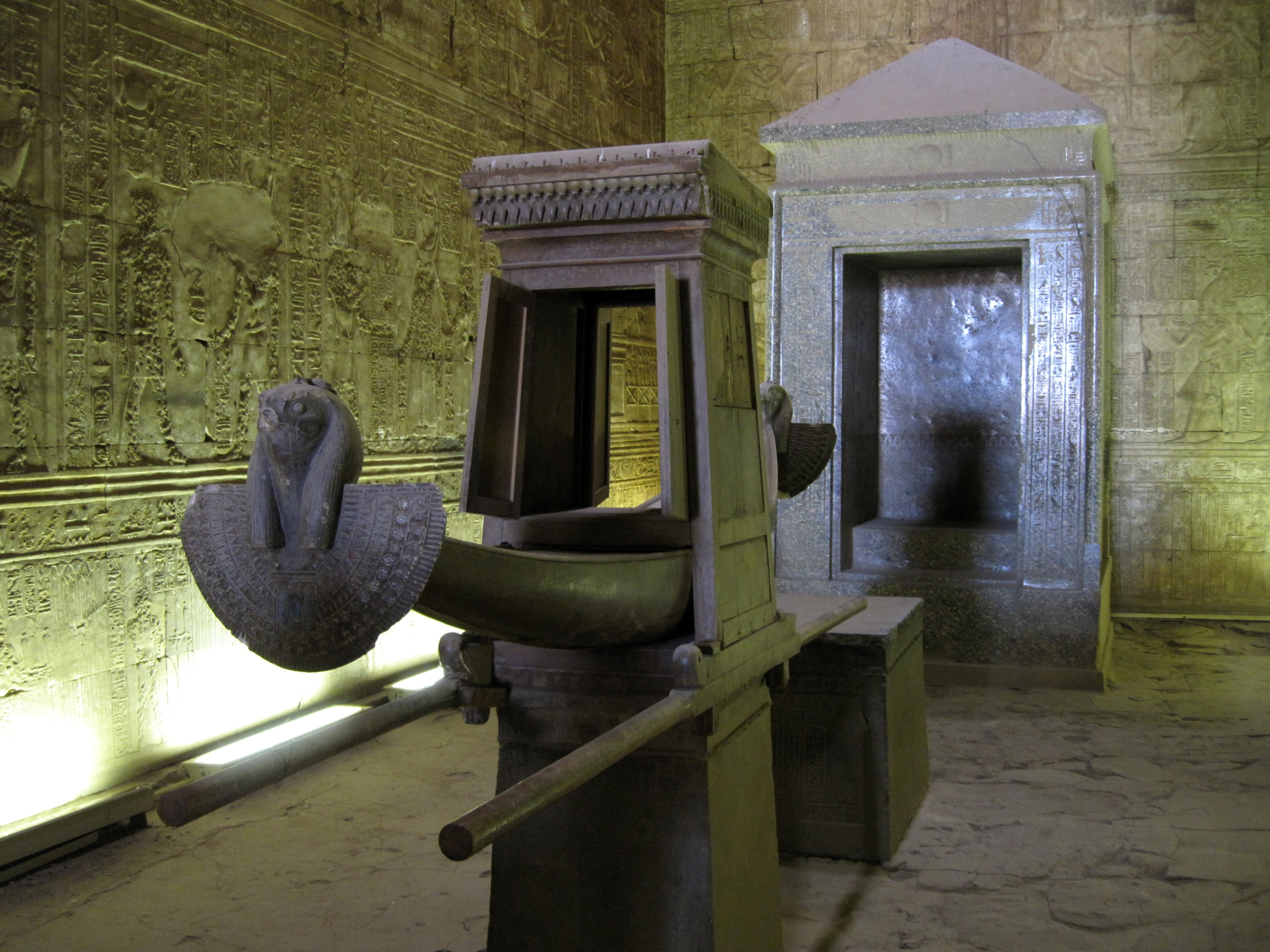
Processional boat preserved in the temple of Edfu.

On the sixteenth of Khoiak, probably between the first and third hours of the day, the funeral festival of Oun per takes place, literally “Opening of the House” or more precisely “Opening of the Sanctuary”. The sacred dough intended to produce the new Seker is taken in procession in the temple, through the cemetery where all the old figurines rest and in the “Valley” that is to say the local necropolis. The vase which contains this material is placed in the atourit, a reliquary chest in gilded wood 78 cm long by 36 cm wide, topped with a statuette of Anubis as a lying jackal. This chest is transported in a small sacred boat 183 cm long provided with four stretchers to allow it to be carried in the arms of men (Book V, 82-83):

“At the Opening of the sanctuary, he goes out with guardian Anubis […] the sixteenth and twenty-fourth Khoiak. He walks through the temple of the divine necropolis; he enters and travels through the valley. There are four obelisks of the divine shrine of the Children of Horus in front of him, as well as the ensign gods. (Note: During the procession, the boat is preceded by four small portable obelisks, usually erected during funeral celebrations. They symbolise the four cardinal points and the four children of Horus, assigned by Anubis to protect the mummy of Anubis, which is constantly threatened by hostile demonic forces (Set and his accomplices). The sign-gods symbolise all the regions of the country.) — Ritual of the mysteries, Book V, col. 82-83. Translation by Émile Chassinat reviewed by Sylvie Cauville.

==== Casting of the Seker ====
Later, at the third hour of the day, in the temple, a priest with a shaved head takes the silver vase where, since the twelve (or fourteen) Khoiak, the ball of dough used to make the Seker figurine rested . The vase is placed on the lap of a statue of Nut, the celestial goddess considered to be the mother of Osiris. The two pieces of the gold mold of the Seker are brought and placed on the ground on a rush mat. The mold is brushed with oil and the sacred dough is poured inside. Once the mold is filled and closed, it is placed on a sheltered bed in a covered pavilion until the nineteenth of the month (Book VI, 121-125).

"Then a shorn priest sits on a stool of moringa wood, in front of her, covered with a panther's skin, with a loop of real lapis lazuli on his head. This vase is placed on his hands, and he says: “I am Horus who comes to you, Mighty One, I bring you these things from my father. We place the vase on the knees of the Great One who gives birth to the gods, then we bring the mold of Seker […] Anoint her body with sweet moringa oil. We place the contents of this vase inside. While the front part of the mold is on the ground, on a rush mat, the contents of this vase are placed there and the rear part of the mold is placed on it." — Ritual of the Mysteries, Book VI, col. 122-124 (extracts). Translation by Émile Chassinat reviewed by Sylvie Cauville .

=== Days from the sixteenth to the nineteenth Khoiak ===
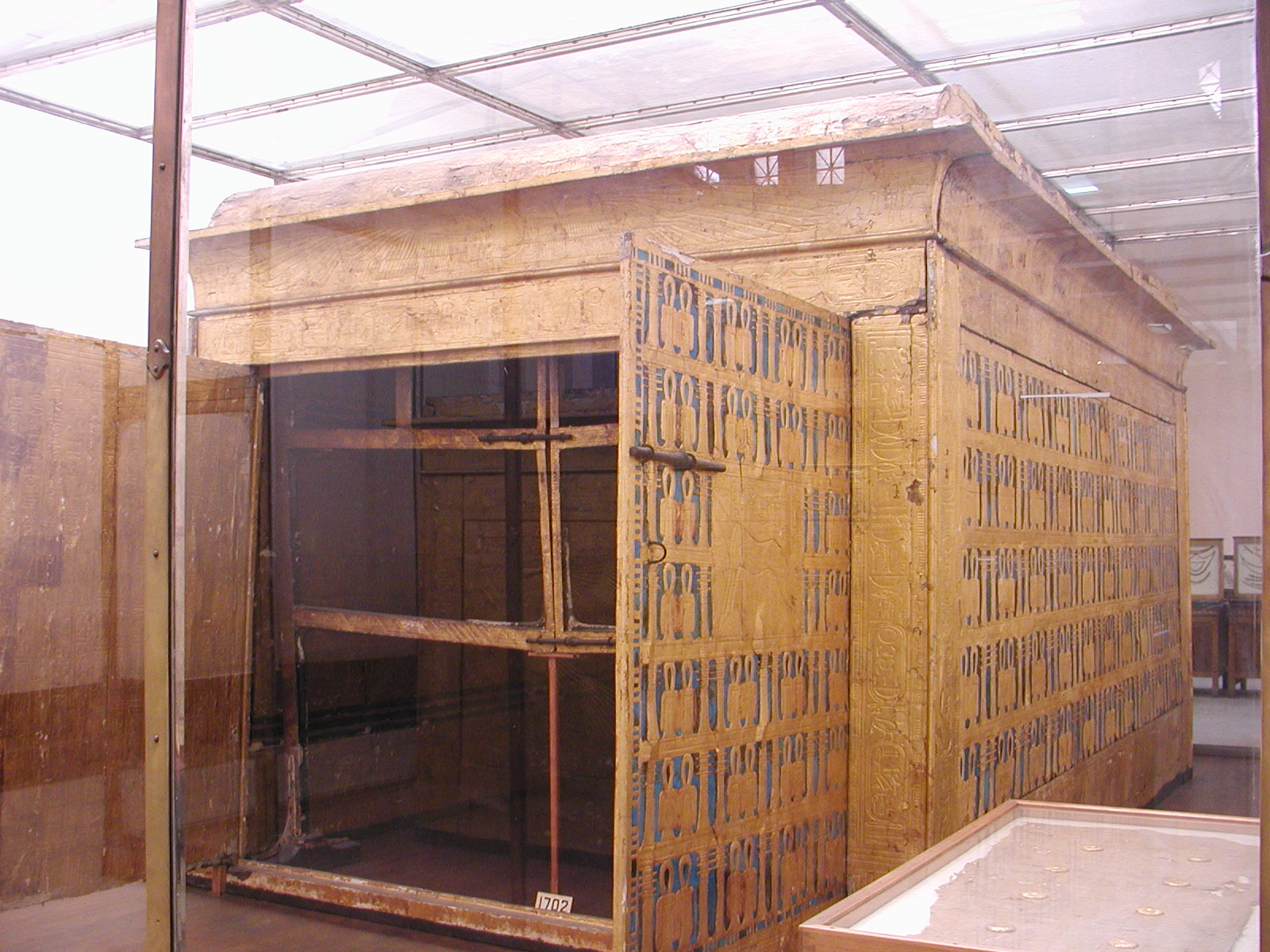
For four days, the mould of the Seker rested in a miniature system of nested chapels similar to those in Tutankhamun tomb.

Between the sixteenth and nineteenth Khoiak, the symbolic reconstitution of the dismembered body of Osiris takes place. In a room of the temple, the mold of the Seker filled with its sacred paste rests on a golden funeral bed measuring one cubit two palms in length (67 cm ), the head turned towards the north. The threshold of the room is guarded by two statuettes of Hu and Sia, personifications of the word and the omniscience of the creator god Atum-Re. The bed is placed in the heneket nemmyt room, 1.57 m long, 1.05 m wide and 1.83 m high, made with black ebony wood plated with gold. This room is itself placed under a rectangular pavilion comprising fourteen wooden columns linked together by papyrus mats:

“As for the canvas-covered pavilion, it is made of coniferous wood and consists of fourteen columns erected on the ground, the top and base of which are made of bronze. A covering of papyrus mats and plants surrounds it. Its length is seven cubits (= 367.5 cm), its width, three 1/2 cubits (= 183.75 cm), its height, eight cubits (= 420 cm). It is covered with fabric on the inside." — Ritual of the Mysteries, Book VI, col. 69-71. Translation by Émile Chassinat reviewed by Sylvie Cauville ^{96} .

=== Khoiak Nineteenth Day ===
On the nineteenth of Khoiak, at the third hour of the day, the Seker figurine came out of the mold in which it had rested since the sixteenth of the month. In order to dry and harden it perfectly, it is placed until the twenty-third of the month on a base, in full sun. However, so that it does not crack, it is regularly anointed with perfumed water:

“We then remove this god from inside the mold, we place him on a gold base. It is exposed to the sun and anointed with dry myrrh and water every day until the twenty-third Khoiak comes." — Ritual of the Mysteries, Book VII, col. 125-126. Translation by Émile Chassinat reviewed by Sylvie Cauville.

=== Night of the twenty-first Khoiak ===
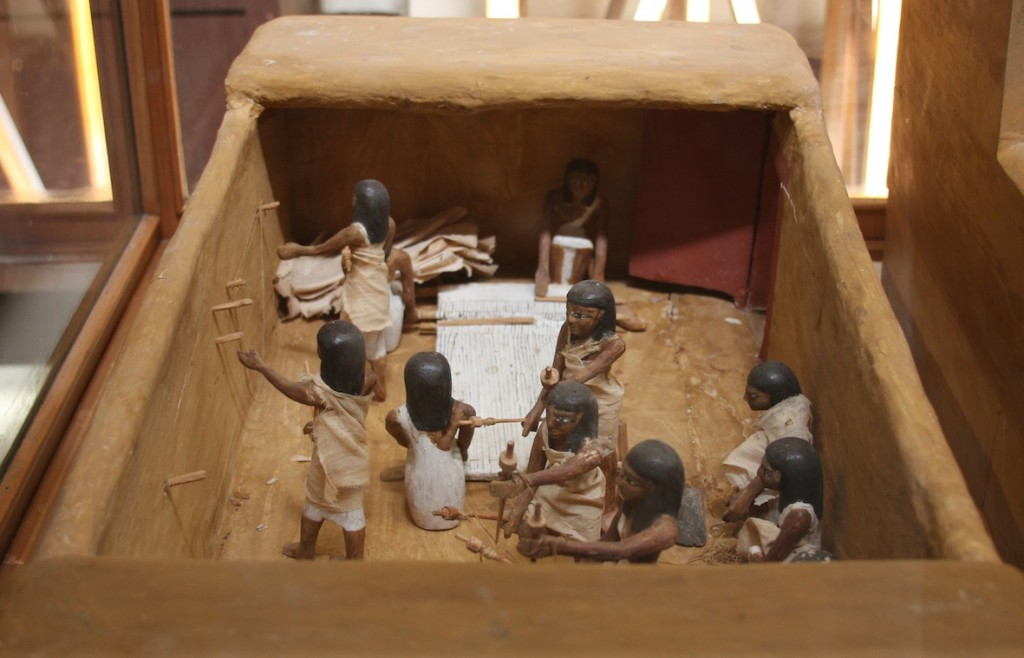
Model of a weaving workshop discovered in the tomb of Meketre (11th Dynasty), Luxor Museum.

On the twentieth of Khoiak, at the eighth hour of the night, the weaving of a piece of fabric intended to serve as funeral linen for the sacred figurines begins. The work continues for a whole day and ends the next day, the twenty-first, at the same time:

“As for the piece of one-day cloth, it is made from the twenty-first to the twenty-first Khoiak, which is twenty-four hours to work on it, from the eighth hour of the night to the eighth hour of the night. Its length is nine 1/3 cubits (= 490 cm), its width is three cubits (= 157.5 cm) […] As for the rope for binding the jersey, it is made with the piece of fabric d 'one day, just like the linen shroud of the two companions" — Ritual of the mysteries, Book V, col. 50-52. Translation by Émile Chassinat reviewed by Sylvie Cauville.

=== Twenty-first Khoiak Day ===
==== Unmolding the Khenti-Amentiu ====
Since the twelfth of the month, to shape the Khenti-Amentiu figurine, a mixture of sand and barley rested in a mold made of two gold pieces. The soil was watered every day to cause the seeds to germinate. On the twenty-first Khoiak, once the young shoots have appeared, the two side parts of the figurine are unmolded. The two blocks thus formed are then joined using an incense-based resin and four cords. Everything is left to dry in the sun until the fifth hour of the day. The same is done for the “Divine Lambeau” which rested in the same garden vat as the Khenti-Amentiu.

“We remove this god from the inside of the mold on this day and we put dry myrrh, a deben, on each of the parts of which it is composed. Place the two sides on top of each other. Bind with four cords of papyrus, namely: one to his throat, the other to his legs, one to his heart, the other to the ball of his white crown, according to this model. Expose it to the sun all day." — Ritual of the Mysteries, Book VI, col. 111-113. Translation by Émile Chassinat reviewed by Sylvie Cauville.

==== Funerary cloth from Seker ====
The twenty-first Khoiak is the day when a piece of fabric (Note: It is not clear from the text whether this fabric is the one mentioned above, woven between the twentieth and the twenty-first, or whether it is another.) is woven to provide the Seker figurine with its funerary linen. This funerary linen is symbolically linked to the ideal duration of human mummification established, according to Herodotus, at exactly seventy days, a duration modeled on that of the embalming by Anubis of the dismembered body of Osiris. (Note: On the subject of this seventy-day period, see the Embalming Process paragraph in the article devoted to the god Anubis.) During this period, the corpse rested in a bath of natron then was washed and wrapped in strips:

“As for the twenty-first Khoiak, it is the day of doing the work of the cloth of a day, because it is the fiftieth day of the embalming workshop, a day counting as ten, and because we make one day's worth of the fifty days of the embalming workshop." — Ritual of the mysteries, Book V, col. 93. Translation by Émile Chassinat reviewed by Sylvie Cauville.

The mummification of the Seker extends symbolically between the sixteenth Khoiak (putting the sacred paste into the mold) and the twenty-third Khoiak (end of drying of the figurine unmolded on the nineteenth), i.e. a duration of seven days corresponding to the sixty -ten days attributed to the consolidation of the body of Osiris (7 x 10 = 70). The twenty-first day, the fifth of the Khoiak ritual process, is therefore related to the fiftieth day (5 x 10 = 50).

=== Twenty-second Khoiak Day ===
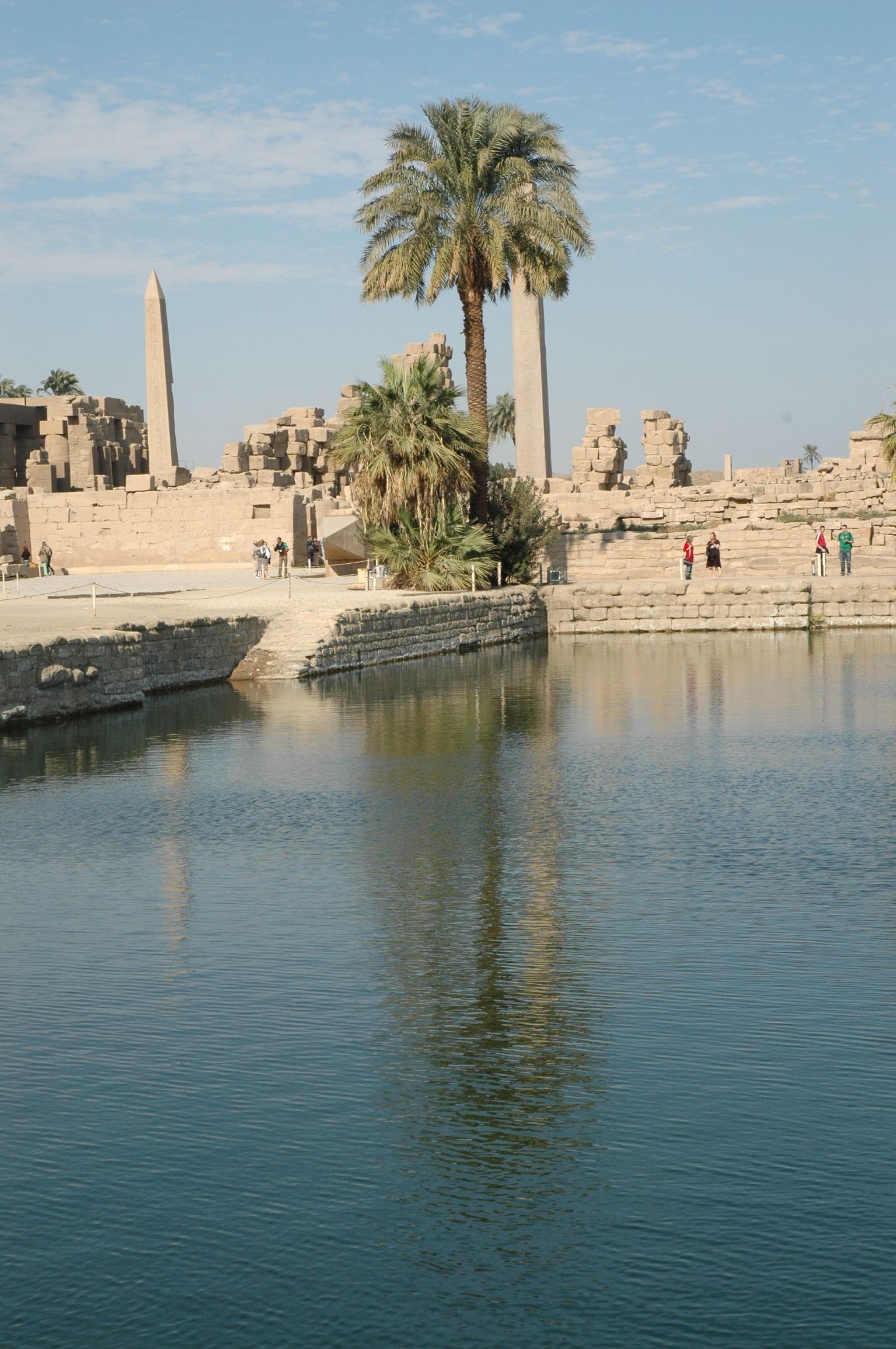
View of the sacred lake of Karnak.

On the twenty-second Khoiak, at the eighth hour of the day, a nautical procession takes place on the sacred lake located within the temple grounds. This celebration involves thirty-four papyrus boats, models one cubit two palms long (67 cm ) which transport the statues of the gods Horus, Thoth, Anubis, Isis, Nephthys, those of the four children of Horus and those of twenty-nine other minor deities. The flotilla is illuminated with a total of three hundred and sixty-five lamps which symbolize the days of the year. The text of the Ritual of the Mysteries does not expressly mention it, but it is possible that this navigation aims to reenact the funeral procession of Osiris through the presence on a boat of the plant figurine of the Khentymentyou; the passage over the water marks the god's entry into the world of the deceased. At the end of the navigation, the divine statues are wrapped in fabrics and placed in the Shentyt, the “mysterious chapel”, in fact a room of the temple dedicated to the Osirian mysteries and where the figurine of Seker is kept for a year. The list of gods participating in navigation is mentioned in Book III (columns 73-78) but is however incomplete due to the ravages of time.

“To sail them on the twenty-second Khoiak, at the eighth hour of the day. There are many lamps beside them, as well as the gods who guard them, each god being designated by name […] This applies to the thirty-four boats alike." — Ritual of the Mysteries, Book II, col. 20-21. Translation by Émile Chassinat reviewed by Sylvie Cauville.

=== Days from twenty-two to twenty-six Khoiak ===
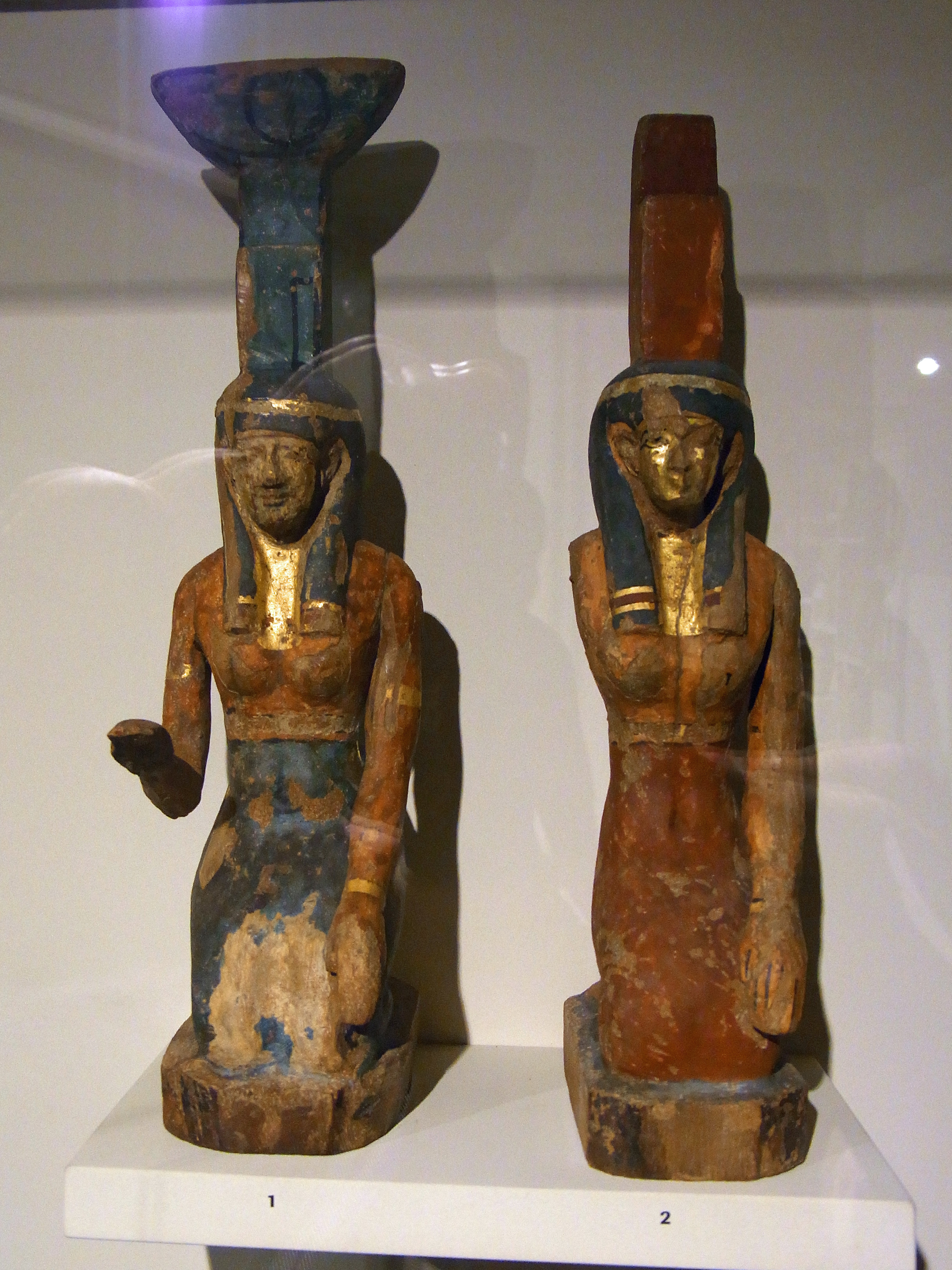
Statuettes of Nephthys and Isis(Tübingen University Museum).

Several papyri from the Ptolemaic era inform us that hymns were chanted between the twenty-two and twenty-six Khoiaks. These are funeral laments intended to hasten Osiris' return to life. An introductory note reports that it is implemented "during each festival of Osiris, on the occasion of all his outings in procession in the country, celebrated in the sanctuaries of Egypt in order to glorify his soul (ba), to maintain the integrity of his corpse, to make his soul shine . " The hymns are pronounced by the twin sisters Isis and Nephthys, the “two kite birds” embodied by two young and beautiful officiants: “We must go and look for two women with pure bodies, who have not given birth, shaved, with girded heads of […], a tambourine in their hands, whose names were inscribed on their shoulders [to identify them with] Isis and Nephthys” . Some laments extend over the five days in question like the “Stances of the Two Oiselles”, others are limited to one day. This was the case on the twenty-fifth Khoiak where the two officiants had to sit on the ground in front of the leaves of the temple courtyard, heads bowed, an ewer and bread in their hands. The priestesses take turns speaking or in pairs. They mourn Osiris and call for his soul to come and inhabit the substitute bodies that are the sacred figurines. (Note: These funerary lamentations have been translated into French: Vernus 1992, Les lamentations d'Isis et Nephtys (p. 96-100); Les stances de la cérémonie des deux oiselles-milan (p. 101-119). For the second text, cf. Lalouette 1994, tome II, p. 74-89: La passion d'Osiris. See also Goyon 1967 for a translation of the ceremonial glorification of Osiris, which belongs to the same literary genre.)

Perfect young man, come to your domain.

A long, long time since we last looked at you! […]

Perfect young man, who left prematurely,

He who rejuvenates prematurely, […]

May you come to us in your former appearance,

So that we kiss you, without you moving away from us,

He with beautiful face, which arouses immense love, [...]

He whose body was numb when he was swaddled,

Come in peace, will you, our master, so that we can contemplate you!

So that the two sisters unite with your body, even though there is no longer any activity in you

[…]the evil being reduced to the state of that which has not come into existence ,

Our heads are bent back on ourselves. […]

May you roam heaven and earth in your former appearance,

Being the bull of the two sisters. […]

— Excerpts from the ceremony of the two oiselles-milan. Translation of Pascal Vernus

=== Twenty-third Khoiak Day ===
==== Face of Seker ====
On the twenty-third Khoiak, at the third hour of the day, the Seker figurine is placed on a granite base and its face is painted. It then remains in the sun for two hours to allow the colors to dry. It is then placed on a mat of reeds:

“Its face is painted in yellow ocher, its jaws in turquoise, its eye like inlaid eyes, its wig in real lapis lazuli, its crook and flagellum in the colors of all real precious stones. Expose it to the sun for two hours. — Ritual of the Mysteries, Book VI, col. 127-128. Translation by Émile Chassinat reviewed by Sylvie Cauville.

==== Amulets of Seker ====
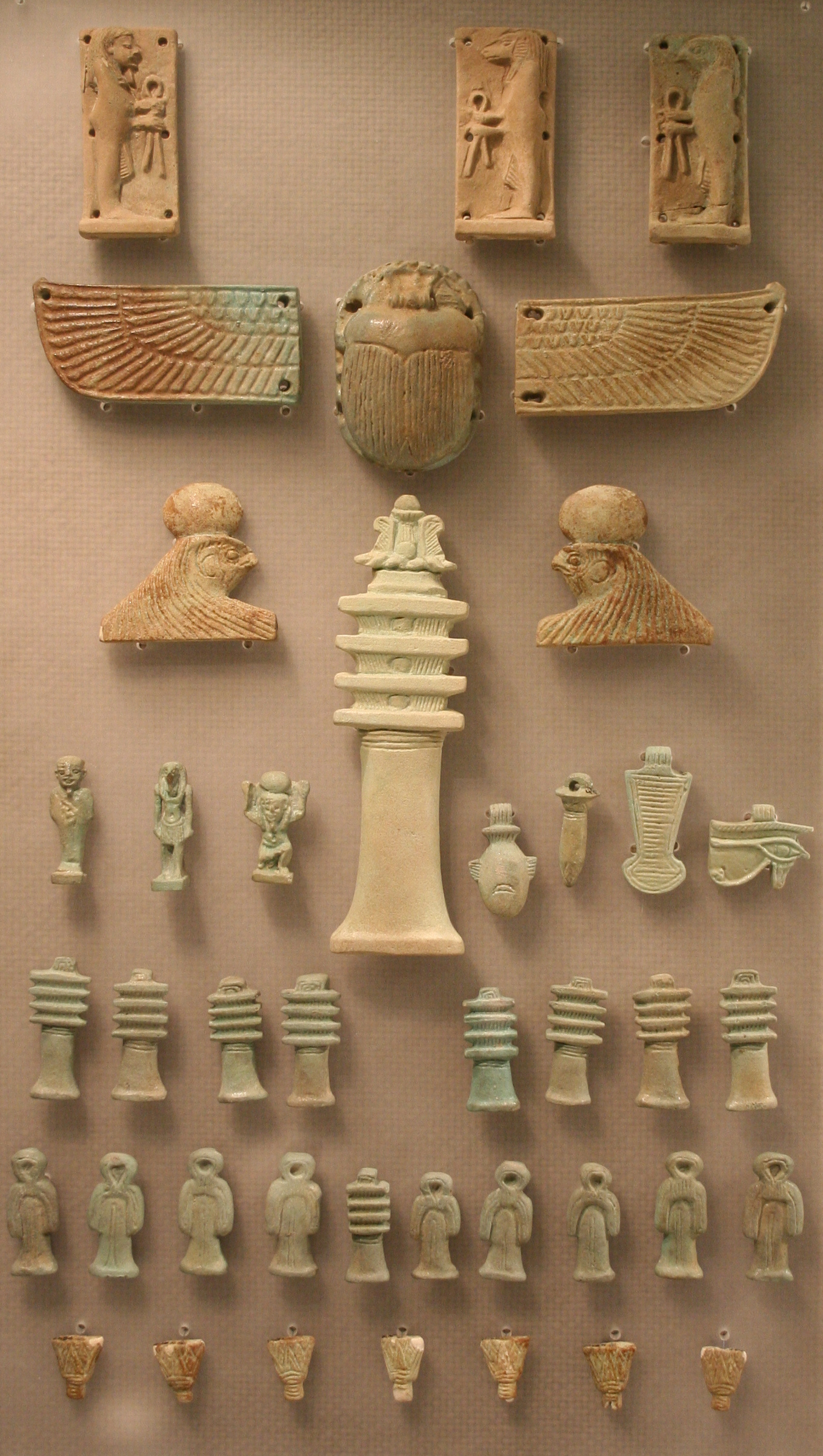
Egyptian amulets (Egyptian Museum, Leipzig).

The same day, the final preparations of the funeral linen for this same statuette took place. Fabrics intended for swaddling are purified and dried. On one of these cloths the four sons of Horus are painted . Embalming wine is cooked. The Seker is then wrapped in its funerary wrappings and magically protected by fourteen protective amulets:

“We wrap it in four strips made from the funeral fabric. They anoint him with ointment. We put the […] on its front part. We wrap it in a cloth. They anoint him with ointment. They put his amulets on him, fourteen amulets, as prescribed in the “Rule of embalming” — Ritual of the Mysteries, Book VII, col. 152-153. Translation by Émile Chassinat reviewed by Sylvie Cauville

The list of these amulets is given in Book V; these are the four children of Horus in carnelian, four Djed pillars in lapis lazuli, a baboon and a lion in basalt, a figurine of Horus in lapis lazuli, a figurine of Thoth in jasper and two Oudjat eyes in lapis lazuli. In Dendera, a list engraved in the doorway of the entrance to the third western chapel of Osiréion, however, indicates an ideal list of one hundred and four amulets. These figures are obviously theoretical (14 for 104) because in practice, due to the small size of the figurines, even the number fourteen was not respected. It seems that a free choice was left to the officiants from the large list. On two statuettes discovered during excavations in the Theban region in 1905 by Louis Lortet and Claude Gaillard, on one only appeared a scarab and five wax uraeus and on the other only the four children of Horus and a beetle.

=== Twenty-four Khoiak Day ===
==== Second procession of the Opening of the Sanctuary ====
On the morning of the twenty-fourth Khoiak, the funerary festival of the Oun per, “Opening of the Sanctuary”, is held for the second time, already celebrated for the first time on the morning of the sixteenth Khoiak. The swaddled Seker figurine is placed in a portable boat. Then, under the leadership of Anubis, she is led in procession through the temple, in its surroundings and in the necropolis (Ritual of the mysteries, Book V, 83).

==== Seker funeral ====
During the ninth hour of the night of the twenty-fourth Khoiak, the figurine of the Seker, which had been swaddled the day before, was locked in a cedar wooden chest and then placed in the Shetyt heret, the “Upper Tomb”, probably a room of the temple (in Dendera, this place is in all likelihood the second western chapel of Osireion where two niches have been built in the walls); she will rest there until the twenty-fourth Khoiak of the following year.

Last year's figurine benefits from new wrappings and new funeral rites intended to revive it. She is then placed on sycamore branches in a portable boat where she remains until the thirtieth of the month awaiting her final burial in the sacred necropolis ( Ritual of the Mysteries, Book VI, 128):

“Remove the divine effigy from the previous year. Cut the envelope that is on it; apply the four strips and the shroud of the divine jersey. This god is buried there according to all the burial rites, as they appear in the Book of Burial . it is placed on sycamore branches at the door of the room of Busiris the Upper, (Note: At Dendera, the Hall of Busiris the High is the third western chapel of the Osireion.) inside the reliquary chest, until the last day of Khoiak comes. — Ritual of the Mysteries, Book VI, col. 129-131. Translation of Émile Chassinat reviewed by Sylvie Cauville

The same night, the Khenti-Amentiu and the “Divine Lambeau” of the previous year are anointed and swaddled in new funeral linens and placed separately in two sycamore chests in which they will be definitively buried on the thirtieth of the month (Book II, 22- 23 and Book VI, 114-115).

Sacred figurine (Late period)

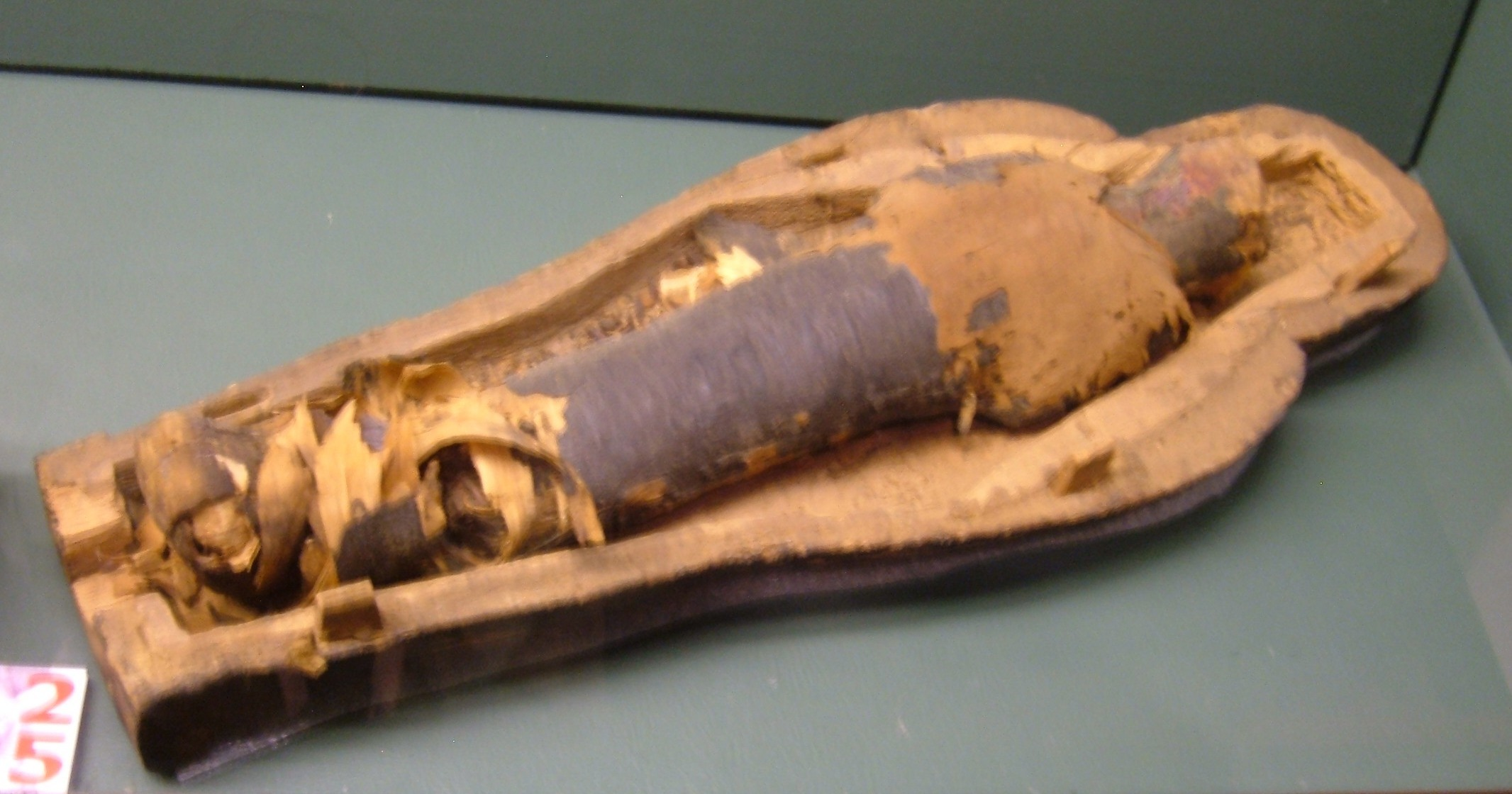
Mummified sacred figurine placed in its coffin (Rosicrusian Museum of San José).

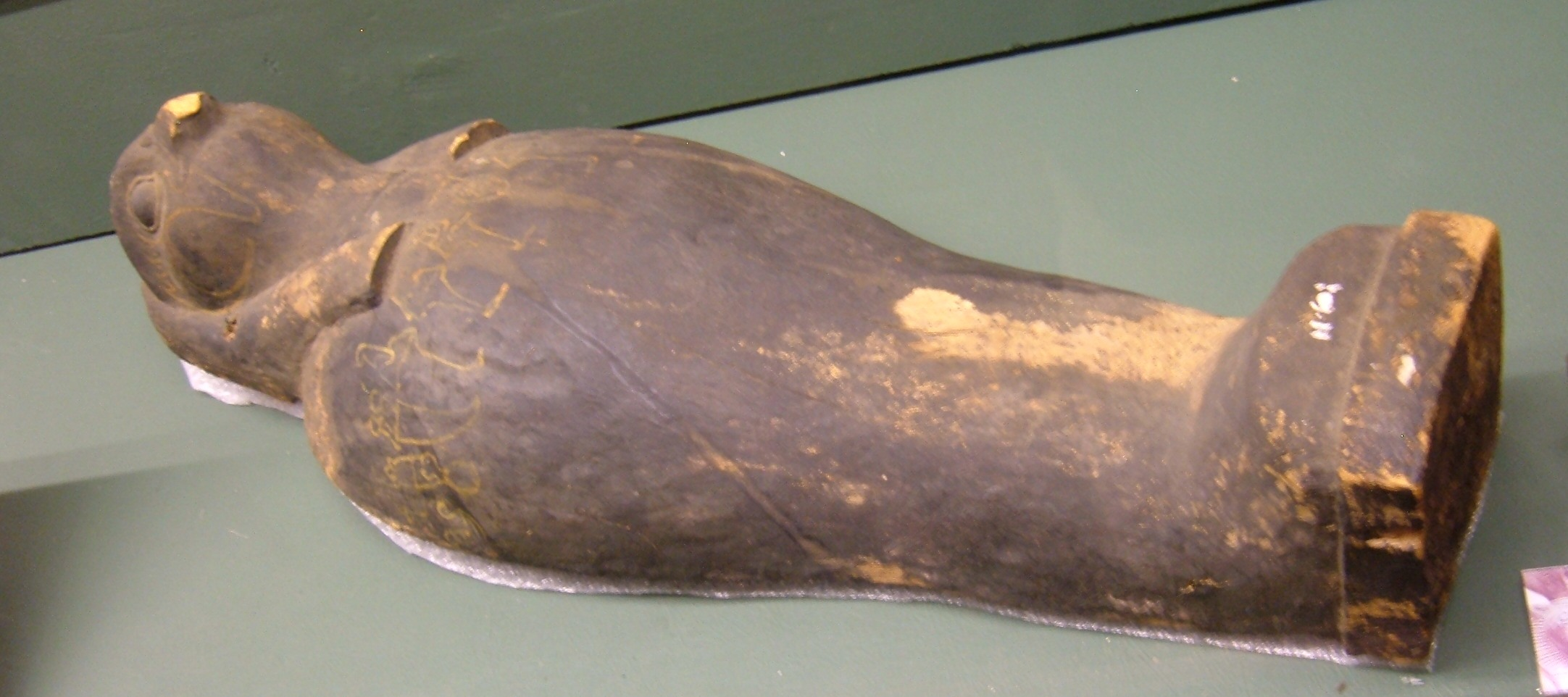
Lid of his sarcophagus with the head of a Sekerian falcon.

=== Days from twenty-four to thirty Khoiak ===
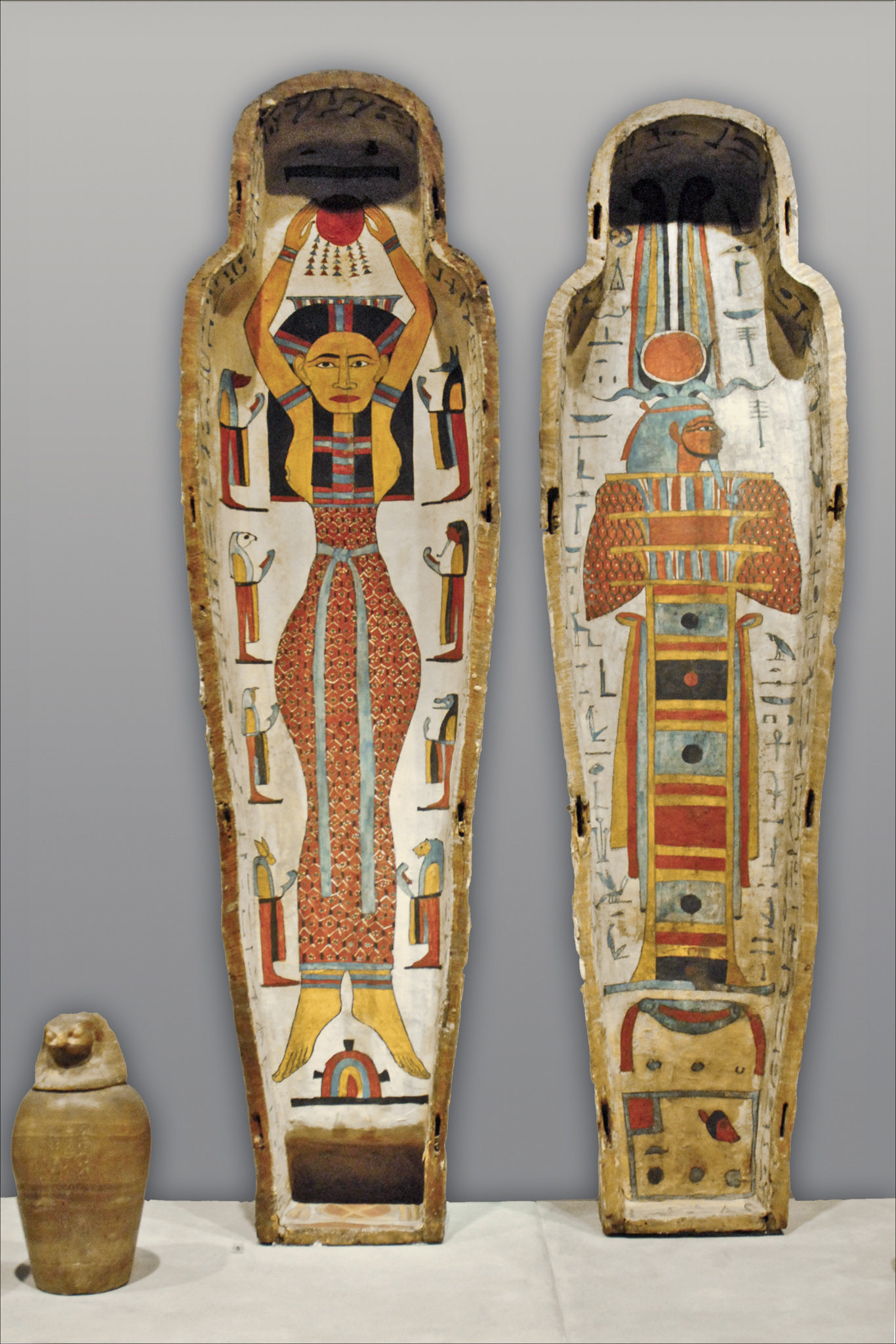
Inside faces of the sarcophagus of the Lady Isetenkheb; on the left Nut, on the right Osiris (Musée des Beaux-Arts de Lyon).

The time interval between the burial of the three new figurines, the twenty-four Khoiak (in a temple room for a period of one year) and the final burial of the three old ones, the thirty Khoiak (in a specially dedicated), is one week. During these seven days, the figurine of Seker, image of the god Osiris, is placed on branches of sycamore, a sacred tree dedicated to Nut . This goddess is the personification of the night sky and the mother of Osiris. This state of rest is imbued with strong symbolism; a day counting as a month, the seven days represent the seven months of the god's gestation in his mother's womb:

“As for each of these seven days that this god passes after the festival of burial without being buried, from the twenty-fourth of Khoiak until the last day of the month, while this god rests on branches of sycamore at the gate of Busiris the Upper, it is for the seven days that he remained in the womb of his mother Nut, when he was conceived in him: a day is for a month, the branches of sycamore to represent Nut. — Ritual of the mysteries, Book V, col. 97-98. Translation by Émile Chassinat reviewed by Sylvie Cauville.

=== Twenty-five Khoiak Day ===
==== Signs- medou ====
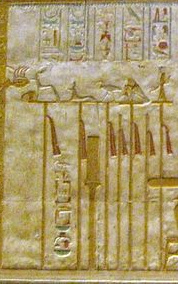
Sacred signs preserved at Abydos (bas-relief from the funerary temple of Sety I).

For the day of the twenty-fifth Khoiak, it is prescribed to take the signs (medou) out of the tomb (Shentyt) where they had been kept for a year. These are kept until the twenty-ninth Khoiak and then are definitively buried in the necropolis the following day. The signs (medou) are sacred sticks the size of a man, topped with the head, human or animal, of the divinity they represent. Practically all the important Egyptian gods are endowed with similar signs. During processions, these signs are carried by priests in front of divine statues or sacred boats. In this case, these signs are miniatures that belong to the previous year's figurines as funerary material. They are removed from their temporary tomb and accompany the expired sacred figurines in the necropolis where they too are buried.

“We enter the mysterious chapel on the twenty-fifth of Khoiak. The emblems of the previous year are carried out of the mysterious chapel. They are placed on a support in a reliquary chest until the 29th day. — Ritual of the Mysteries, Book VII, col. 158-159. Translation by Émile Chassinat reviewed by Sylvie Cauville.

==== “Earth drawing” ceremony ====
The ceremony of khebes-ta or “drawing of the earth” (Note: The Egyptian expression khebes-ta has been variously translated into French: "fête du labourage" (Vandier 1961), "cérémonie de houer le sol" (Goyon 1967, p. 96).) is closely linked to the judgment of the dead before the tribunal of the afterlife and the repression of enemies. It is likely that for each deceased, the mummification rites ended with a staged judgment during a nighttime vigil. The life of the deceased was examined in detail and a favorable judgment restored his social respectability by making him a worthy ancestor. According to chapter eighteen of the Book of the Dead, the ceremony of "drawing the earth" originated from the favorable judgment rendered to Osiris by the judges of Bousiris. It is clearly also a rite of slaughter linked to offering rituals:

“O Thoth who justifies Osiris against his enemies, may you justify N against his enemies in the great tribunal which is in the great excavation ( khebes ta ) of Bousiris, that night when the earth was dug ( khebes ta ) of their blood and Osiris justified against his enemies. “The great tribunal which is in the great excavation of Bousiris” means: the acolytes of Set came after having transformed themselves into goats. They were then killed in the presence of these gods and their blood flowed from them; they were given to the inhabitants of Bousiris. — Book of the Dead, extract from chap. 18. Translation by Jan Assmann.

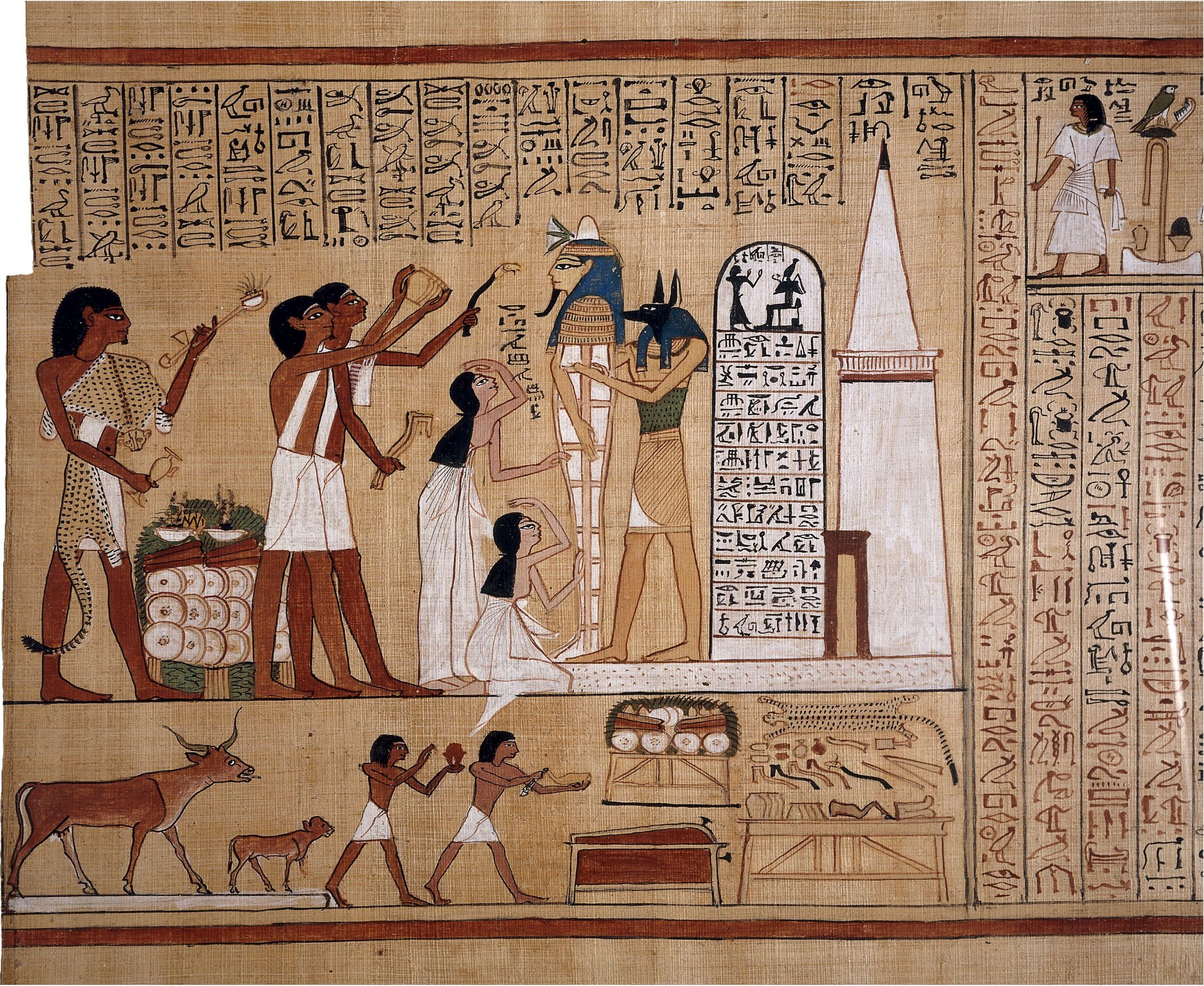
Scene of the opening of the mouth from the Hounéfer Papyrus (British Museum).

A papyrus dated to the early Ptolemaic period, the Ceremonial of Glorification of Osiris, describes the funerary rites performed on the twenty-fifth of Khoiak and on the night of the twenty-fifth to the twenty-sixth. It is a commemoration of the beneficial acts that the gods did for Osiris. Anubis plays a leading role as a mummifier and Thoth as a ritualistic priest guaranteeing the proper conduct of the ceremonies intended to vivify the soul of Osiris:

“[…] when this disaster occurred for the first time, a holy place was built for you in Bousiris for your mummification and to make your smell pleasant. We made Anubis be for you in the embalming office (ouabet) in order to perform his rites there and that I and your sister Nephthys lighted the torch at the entrance to the holy place. Then Set was chased away like the ousha bird and Anubis left the territory of the embalming house to slay all your enemies. The mourners, for you, made their lamentations resound and your son Horus defeated the rebels by throwing the bond on Set.

The gods stood groaning because of the great misfortune that had befallen you. They raised their complaints to the sky, so that Those-on-the-horizon could hear the grieving goddess lament. When they saw what this Bad One had done to you, Thoth came and stood at the entrance to the embalming office chanting his ritual formulas. So it enlivens your soul ba, every day!

— Glorification of Osiris (excerpt). Translation by Jean-Claude Goyon.

This exposition of the rituals continues by discussing the actions taken by Horus as the son and heir of Osiris during the rituals of the Opening of the Mouth. Osiris is proclaimed victorious over his enemies:

“The great digging of the earth was carried out for you and you were sent on the 25th day of the 4th month of the flood, when you went out at night, the children of Horus carrying you and Horus preceding you, the rope in the hands. Your paths had been prepared, the divine fathers and servants of the god purified to open your mouth through the ritual of opening the mouth, the chief reader-priest and the ouâb- priests have their books of glorification in their hands and recite it before you, the sem- priest opens his mouth to you saying: Seker in the boat- henu is justified! Your enemies have fallen! — Glorification of Osiris (excerpt). Translation by Jan Assmann .

==== Seker Onion Festival ====
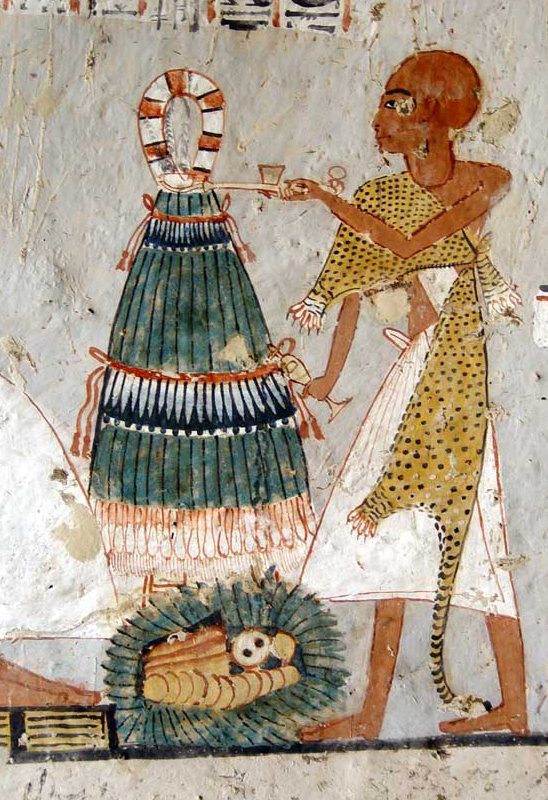
Offering of a braid of onions by a priest to an ancestor, tomb of Roy (Sheikh Abd el-Gournah).

Under the New Kingdom, during the night of the twenty-fifth to the twenty-sixth Khoiak, a rite based on an offering of onions took place in the Theban necropolises: the netjeryt festival or “festival of divinization”. Onion is a very common food in ancient Egypt. As such, this plant is one of the vegetable offerings delivered pell-mell to the gods in temples. During the netjeryt festival, the offering is specific and comes in the form of artistically braided necklaces. The ritual takes place only in the chapels of private tombs, so this rite is not known within the circle of the royal family. At nightfall, the priests of the Ka and the families go to the funeral chapels to make libations of water and fumigations of incense. Until the dawn of the twenty-sixth Khoiak, the living made onion necklaces in the necropolis which they then tied around their necks as well as braids with handles in order to be able to transport them to the sanctuaries dedicated to the god Seker . During this night of vigil, all the ancestors are assimilated to Seker and are purified by the curative virtues of the onion which, in the popular mind, was considered one of the most effective means against the evil eye and disease. (Note: Onions are used in Egyptian pharmacopoeia for anti-scorpion and anti-snake recipes, as a curative and preventive measure, in unction, inhalation, potion and whitewash. It is also used during mummification for its antiseptic properties, being placed under strips in the abdomen and eye cavities in bulb or peel form.) The figurine of the Seker and thereby all the deceased who are assimilated to it, who previously had undergone the ritual of the opening of the mouth, are definitively blessed with the breath of life. The presentation of the onion necklaces represents the gift of a new, protective and luminous heart. (Note: The priests developed various sound games based on the homophony of the words hedjou 'onion', hedjou 'lower jaw', hedj 'destroy' and hedj 'light'. In chapter 936 of the sarcophagus texts, which describes the ceremonial opening of the mouth, the five onions are the white teeth that illuminate the face of the deceased. Elsewhere, Horus' milk tooth, which fell to the ground, gave birth to the onion, and new onions are harvested during the month of Khoiak.)

=== Morning of the twenty-sixth Khoiak ===
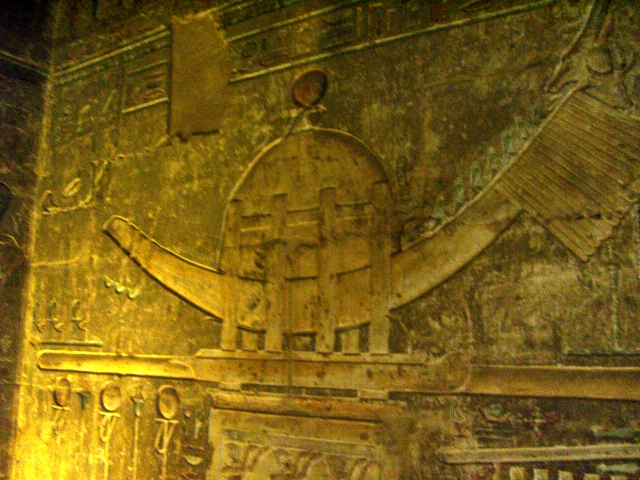
Processional boat of Seker (bas-relief from the temple of Deir el-Medineh).

Although the twenty-sixth Khoiak is not mentioned in the Ritual of Mysteries, this day is the most important and famous of the month. In all cities across the country, processions commemorate the rebirth of the god Seker, the mummified falcon, into a reborn and regenerated falcon. This national ritual has its origins in the ancient procession of Memphis, the peher, where since the Old Kingdom, at dawn on this day, the henou boat of the god Seker is placed on a sled in order to complete the tour. from the city walls, carried by officiants and to the acclamations of a joyful crowd. Under the New Kingdom, it is not certain that this ritual dedicated to Seker was merged into the Mysteries of Osiris of the month of Khoiak. (Note: In 1969, Gaballa and Kitchen, after studying the Sokar festivities based on the wall decorations in the funerary temple of Ramses III at Medinet Habu, concluded that the Seker procession on the twenty-sixth of Khoiak was probably integrated into the Osirian mystery cycle well before the beginning of the New Kingdom .Gaballa & Kitchen (1969) In 2006, K.J. Eaton challenged this hypothesis after studying the funerary temple of Sety I at Abydos, where, according to her, the two processions, those of Sokar and Osiris, were part of two different memorial cycles held in the same place and in the same month (Eaton 2006).) Indeed, at Abydos, the decorative program of thefuneral temple of Seti I seems rather to suggest the existence of two independent ceremonies during Khoiak, one dedicated to Seker, the other to Osiris, each comprising its own procession departing from the same religious building, but from different interior chapels. This is no longer the case from the Late Period when the rites of Seker are intimately integrated into the Osirian mysteries. This is how in Edfu, in imitation of Memphis, the procession follows the peheret corridor located between the temple of Horus and the interior side of its surrounding wall. In Medinet Habu, the procession does the same along the walls of the temple, while in Dendera, the ceremony is held on the roof terrace of the temple of Hathor from the eastern chapels to reach the western chapels of the Osiréion, the upper terrace evoking the Memphite walls. During the journey, Setian animals such as a red bull, probably wax miniatures, are massacred to symbolize the victory of the forces of good over those of evil. On the arrival of the boat, the god Seker-Osiris is covered with praise - Doua Ousir where his numerous local forms are mentioned (bull, young man, falcon, phoenix, uraeus, etc.)

“On the twenty-fourth Khoiak, procession of Osiris during the night, stopping at the lake pavilion, doing all the rites, going through the temple, stopping in his place. On the twenty-fifth of Khoiak, when the twelfth hour of the day arrives, procession of Osiris who presides over the West, reaching the temple of Horus, stopping in the place of eternity. On the twenty-sixth Khoiak, procession from Seker at first light to the temple of Horus; make libations, return to the temple and stop there. Procession of Hathor, mistress of Iounet and her ennead, to the roof of the great hall, to unite with the disc, to stop at her sanctuary: in all one night and two days. — Calendar of the hypostyle of the temple of Hathor. Translation by Sylvie Cauville.

=== Night and morning of the thirtieth Khoiak ===
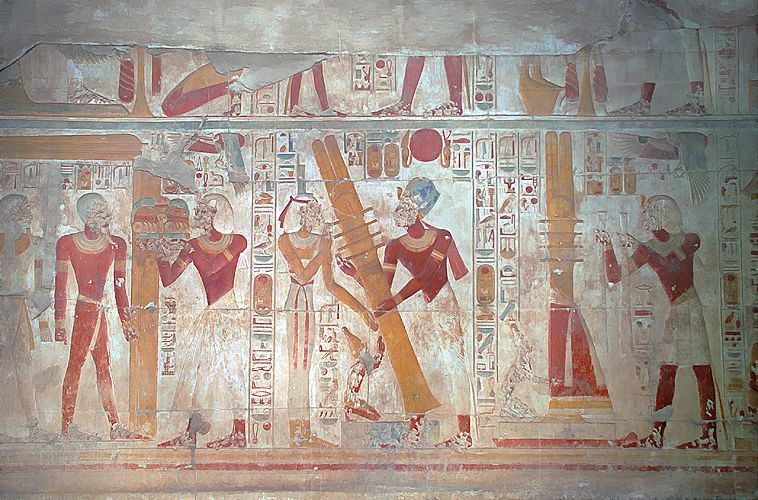
Ritual for the erection of the Djed pillar. Osiris Chapel in the funerary temple of Sety I at Abydos.

Khoiak commemorations end on the thirtieth, last day of the month. At the ninth hour of the night, the three figurines cast the previous year are taken to the necropolis and definitively buried. The tomb consists of a crypt located under a sacred mound planted with one or more balanites, thorny trees producing fruits similar to dates.

When day breaks, the ceremony of straightening the Djed pillar is held, a fetish associated with the funerary gods Seker, Ptah and Osiris and assimilated to the latter's backbone. The exact nature of the Djed, attested in iconography since prehistoric times, is not known (stylized sheaf of cereals or delimbed tree trunk). However, we know that the fetish evokes the notions of stability and duration. The pillar, with a flared foot and head, is surmounted by four flat elements apparently fitted one on top of the other. Often, the Djed is anthropomorphized by having eyes and arms. At dawn on the thirtieth Khoiak, a large Djed pillar is erected on a pedestal by the pharaoh himself, either alone or assisted by priests; the ruler playing the role of Horus, son and heir of Osiris as well as triumphant over Set, the god's murderer. This ceremony perhaps originated in the city of Busiris (whose Egyptian name Djedou is written hieroglyphically with one or two Djed) but is also attested very early in Memphis in connection with Ptah.

“As for the last day of Khoiak, erection of the pillar- djed in Busiris, day of the burial of Osiris, in the Mound of the plants- nebeh, (Note: The nebeh plant has not been formally identified. Symbolically, it is associated with the eastern horizon where the sun disappears in the evening (Texts from the sarcophagi, chapter 691). It is perhaps an elevated marsh plant.) in the crypt which is under the balanites, because it is in that day that the relics of Osiris were brought, after the burial of Osiris. Erect the pillar- djed [...] Erect it when it is wrapped. — Ritual of the mysteries, Book V, col. 95-97. Translation by Émile Chassinat reviewed by Sylvie Cauville.

== Symbolism of the ingredients of sacred figurines ==
In the minds of the ancient Egyptians, plants, minerals and living beings (animals or humans) are emanations from the gods. This is how several myths explain the origin of things as being saliva, tears, blood or divine sperm that fell to the ground during events that occurred in the lives of the gods. During the month of Khoiak, when the priests water the barley of the “Osiris-vegants” or when they mix the various ingredients intended to form the dough of the Sokar, a long and complex process takes place, a Great Work, (Note: In his 1940-1948 translation of the Khoiak ritual, Émile Chassinat was careful not to translate the word téreh, which is rendered as "Grand Œuvre" in Sylvie Cauville's 1997 translation. According to the first scholar, it is possible to give three definitions to the word Téreh: -the operation of moulding the statuette, preparing the material and placing it in the mould; -the special name of the statuette; -that of the occult work, a sort of incubation, by which the paste first shaped into an earthen egg on the twelfth of Khoiak is then placed in the mould on the sixteenth of Khoiak so that it can be transformed into a mummy with a human head until the nineteenth of the month (Cf. Chassinat 1966, p. 272).) assimilated to the gestation of the god Osiris in the womb of his mother Nut . The ingredients are weighed carefully and meticulously in the presence of the statue of Chentayt . They are then associated in a precise order, each product being in itself mythical information and a part of the divinity from which it emanates. Mixing these ingredients thus amounts to connecting the myths together, to invoking the divine powers and encouraging them to act on earth for the well-being of the Egyptian people.

=== Nile flood water ===
==== Ritual water ====
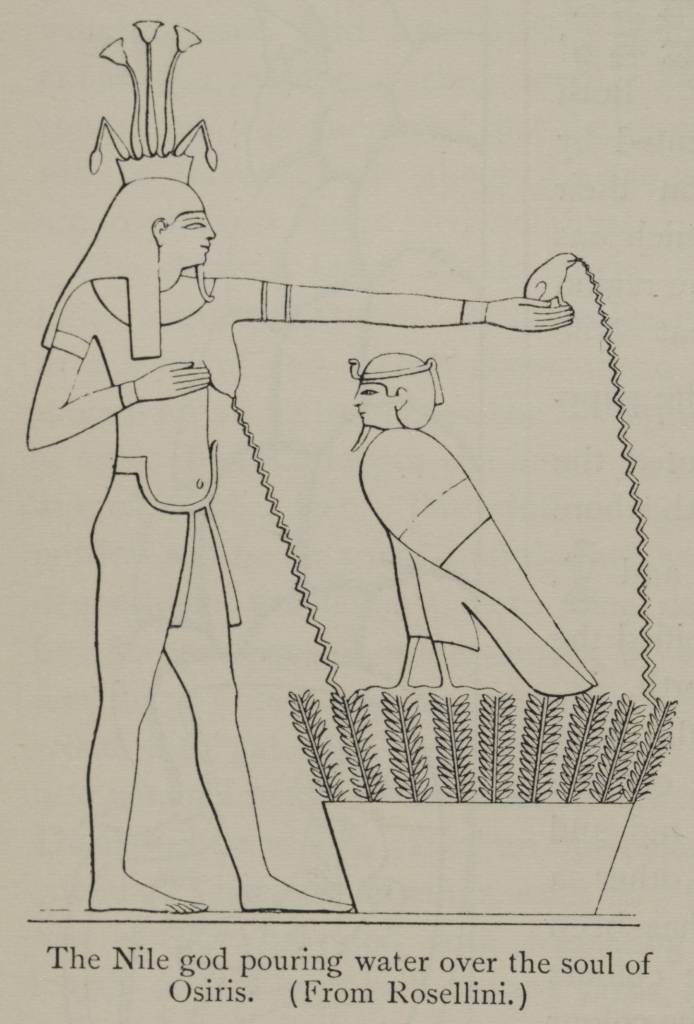
On the island of Bigeh, Hapi waters the grove where the soul-ba of Osiris nestles (illustration from the Philæ temple).

Along with barley and earth, water from the flooding of the Nile is one of the main ingredients used in the composition of sacred figurines. For nine days, from the twelve to the twenty-first Khoiak, the Khenti-Amentiu is regularly watered in order to make its shoots germinate. The same goes for the Divine Shred . As for Sokar, its dough is made ductile by incorporating dates and water. Furthermore, throughout the unfolding of the Mysteries, water plays a major role in the libations offered to Osiris and the other gods invoked during the high points of these sacred days. This ritual water was drawn by the officiants from the sacred lake of the sanctuary or from a canal near the temple. To show that the entire Egyptian nation participates in these ceremonies, a frieze from the base of the Osireion of Dendera (west median chapel) shows a procession of forty-two Hapi genii, one for each nome of the kingdom. Each of them performs a libation on an altar laden with food. Each libation bears a specific name, that of the flood which floods the canal specific to the nome; for example “the Hebebet flood from the Ougy canal" for the 3rd nome of Upper Egypt or “the âka flood overflowing from the Bâh canal ” for the 5th nome of Lower Egypt. All these libations are intended for Osiris and are presented by Pharaoh in order to hasten the reconstitution of the dismembered Osirian body and, thereby, to stimulate the rebirth of the plant world which brings to the country good harvests, religious harmony and social peace:

They are all alive, they stand before you carrying the water of renewal to invigorate your heart with libations, you receive bread from their hands, you eat it. […] you make their cereals grow, the abundance spreads across the country, you supply the granaries with produce, you provide the sanctuaries, you largely provide the places of worship with food, you flood the altar of the Guardian Gods, you supply the offering tables (...) with bread, meat and beer, you establish Egypt under the power of Horus by bringing the products of the earth to his sanctuary. Your festivals will last without end and eternally, your rites will be fixed forever, Osiris […] your beautiful face is pleased with your son whom you love, the king of Upper and Lower Egypt, master of the Two lands. — Osireion de Dédérah, Procession of the 42 Nomes of Egypt, translation by Sylvie Cauville.

==== Nilotic calendar ====
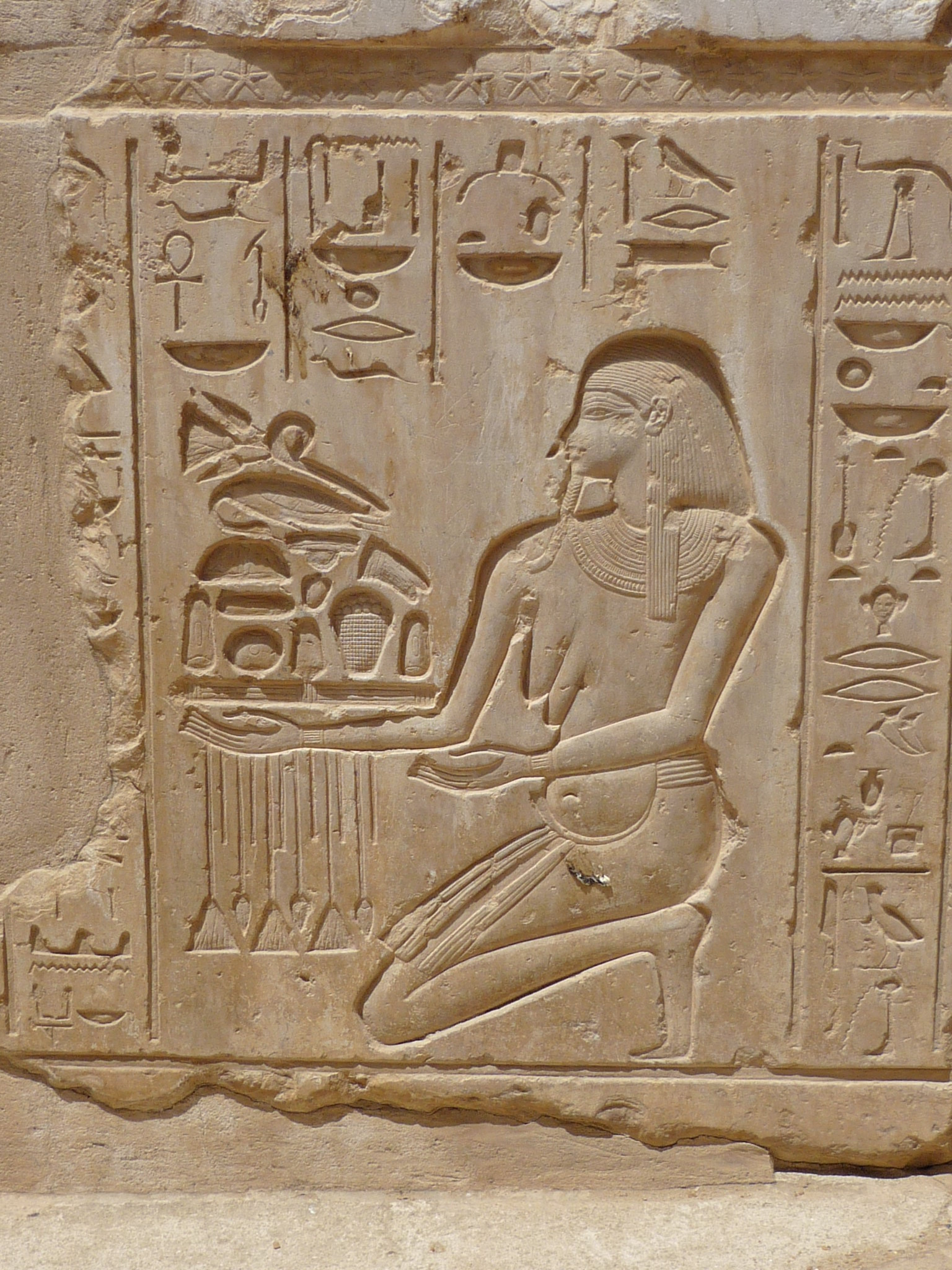
Hapi offering abundance to Pharaoh Ramses III (Medinet Habu temple).

The ancient Egyptians were a people of farmers whose survival depended on the growth of cereals (wheat, barley, sorghum). As the country is almost rainless, the fertility of the fields is solely linked to the annual flooding of the Nile. Agricultural land is irrigated by a complex system of canals and dikes to distribute water as equitably as possible. The soil is renewed and fertilized by an annual supply of silt and clay deposits carried by water from the African Great Lakes. Every year the flood is watched with anxiety, because if it is insufficient or, on the contrary, if it is too great, scarcity or even famine will follow. The flood begins in mid-June, but it is not until the second half of July that the waters swell in a powerful current. At the end of September, the flood reached its highest level. Agricultural land is submerged and only villages built on the highest points still emerge like islands. For a month, the water stagnates at this level, then decreases more and more quickly. In December–January, the Nile returned to its bed. However, the waters continue to fall and in May–June, the river experiences low water, reducing to half of the ordinary width. The “Mysteries of Osiris” ritual takes place in Khoiak (straddling our months of October and November), the fourth month of the flood season. During these days, the flood is already beginning, but the fields, still soggy, remain uncultivable. Seeding of cultivable plots does not begin until mid-Tobi (early December). Egyptian priests endowed Osiris with agrarian characteristics. The life, death and rebirth of Osiris were mapped to the three seasons of the Egyptian calendar; Akhet “the flood”, Péret “the recession” and Chemou “the drought”. In the agrarian cycle, the rebirth of vegetation is the sign of the rebirth of Osiris. But this rebirth is only possible with the return of the flood, a crucial phenomenon personified by Hapi, the obese god, provider of food ^{125} .

==== Lymphs of Osiris ====
According to the ancient Egyptians, the annual cycle of the Nile with its alternation of flood and recession finds its existence in the murder of Osiris, the flow of his lymphs signifying the coming of the flood. According to a stele erected at Abydos by Ramses IV, Osiris the murdered god and Hapi the provider of food are one and the same:

“You (Osiris), you are Hapi the high who spreads at the beginning of the season. Gods and men live on the flows that emanate from you. — Large Abydenian stele of Ramesses IV. Translation by Benoit Claus.

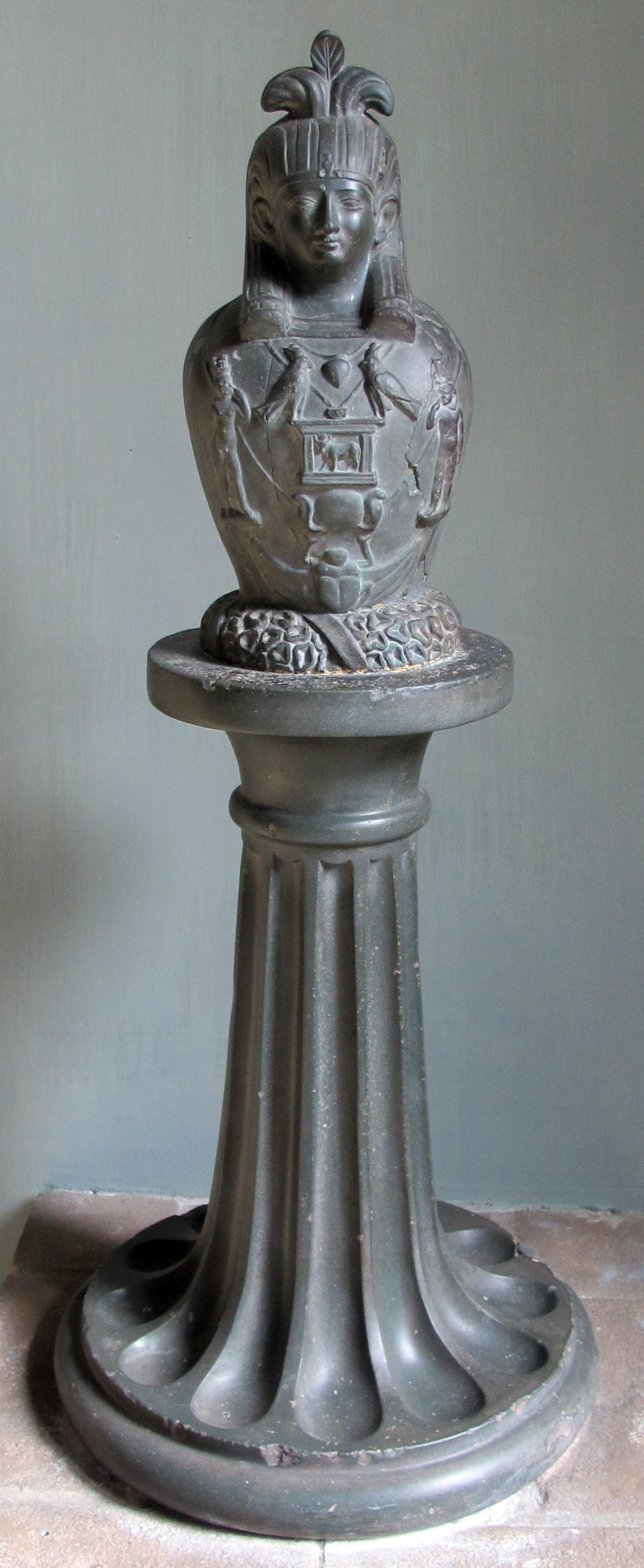
Representation of a canopic vase with a head of Osiris on a support (Museo Gregoriano Egizio).

Osiris and Hapi are two cyclical deities who converge thanks to the element- redjou . This Egyptian term is strictly speaking untranslatable and designates any liquid that comes out of a divine body. French-speaking Egyptologists, however, restore the word redjou (plural: redjouou ) by “flow”, “exudation”, “humours” or “lymphs”. For Osiris, the redjouou are the bodily fluids resulting from the putrefaction of his corpse. It concerns more particularly the morbid excretions of the intestines, which escaping from his anus, flowed into the waters of the Nile. In the case of Hapi, the redjouou are the fertile elements of the flood such as the silt suspended in the waters. In Dendera, during the days of the Mysteries, the flows of Osiris are compared to the grains of barley used to make sacred figurines. During the Canopic Procession, the god Min of the Coptite nome brings Osiris a vase containing the putrefied intestines of the god:

Words to be said by Min master of the Coptite nome, the great god who takes place in Iounet, who makes his father live with the water of renewal, who protects the belly containing the divine humors: “I come to you, Osiris, take for yourself the belly containing the grains of barley which are abundant, these are your humors from your body. I bring you the entrails with the humors of the cereals, what is brought is your heart, you put it in its place. — Procession of the canops, translation by Sylvie Cauville.

The mummification of Osiris by Isis signifies the stopping of the flow of lymphs (their damming) and the cessation of the flooding. With the decline, there is a renewal of plants throughout the Egyptian valley. The agricultural land is once again cultivable and the fields are immediately sown by the farmers in preparation for the next cereal harvest. According to chapter 74 of the Sarcophagus Texts, the redjou lymphs of Osiris resulting from the putrefaction of the divine corpse are at the origin of the flood:

“Come let us gather his bones!” Come, let us put his body parts back in order! Come, let us make a barrier against him! Let this not remain inert in our custody! Flow out, lymph from this blessed one! Fill the canals, form the names of the rivers! Osiris, live, Osiris! Let the completely inert one on his side rise! — Texts from the sarcophagi, chap. 74. (Words of Isis to Nephthys). Translation by Paul Barguet.

==== Rise of the flood ====
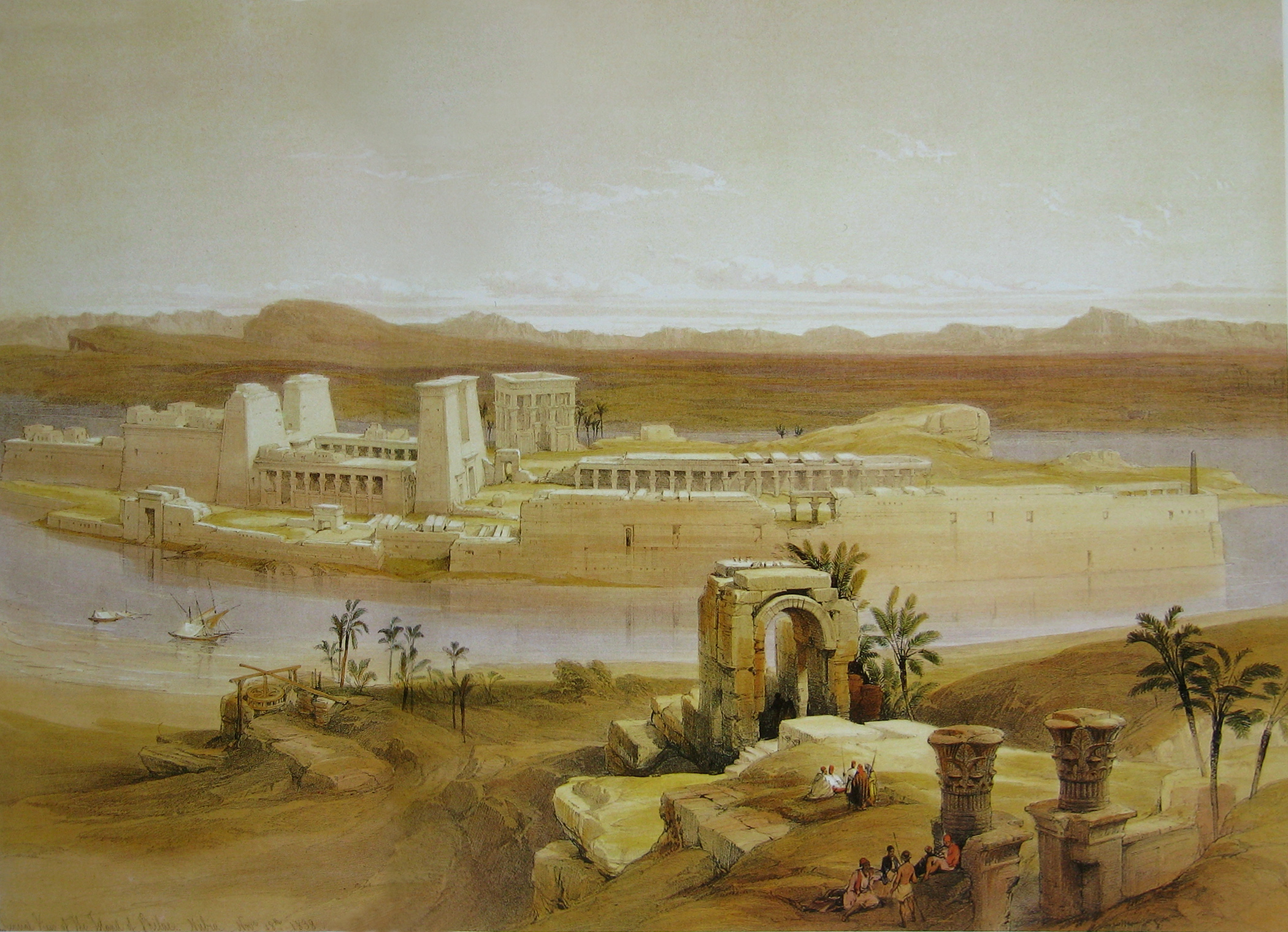
View of the Temple of Philæ from Bigeh Island in 1838 (painting by David Roberts).

In Egyptian thought, after the head, the legs of Osiris are the most famous divine relics. In the Ptolemaic era, tradition attributes the preservation of the left leg to the island of Bigeh. In this place, located opposite the temple of Isis of Philæ, is a tomb where a joint cult is paid to the leg and the ba- soul of Osiris. From this relic the flood of the Nile was supposed to spring. However, this leg was also assimilated to the Moon considered, in a poetic way, as a leg or as the “daughter of the leg”. On the other hand, in Bigeh, the Ba-soul of Osiris was also assimilated to the Moon. This strong symbolism led many nomes to develop a theology around the legs of Osiris. In Dendera, this fact is reflected in the decorative frieze known as the Procession of the Canopics where no less than eight nomes out of forty-two claim these relics. Additionally, a number of textual allusions suggest that Osiris, as a lunar god, had an influence on the flooding of the Nile, bringing fertility and prosperity to Egypt. According to Plutarch, the Egyptians thought that Osiris is the symbol of the lunar world because this star is favorable to the reproduction of animals and the growth of plants thanks to its fertilizing and humidifying light. He also adds that they made symbolic connections between the flood and the phases of the moon:

They also admit that the phases of the moon have a certain connection with the flooding of the Nile. In fact the greatest height of its waters, at Elephantine, is twenty-eight cubits, and this number is equal to that of the days during which the moon appears, and to that which it takes to complete its revolution each month. The smallest height, at Mendès and at Xois, is six cubits: it corresponds to the six days during which the moon reaches its first quarter. The average height which occurs around Memphis is fourteen cubits, when the flood is normal; it corresponds to the days it takes for the moon to reach its full height — Plutarch, On Isis and Osiris, §43. Translation by Mario Meunier.

=== Barley ===
==== Rituals of the vegetating Osiris ====
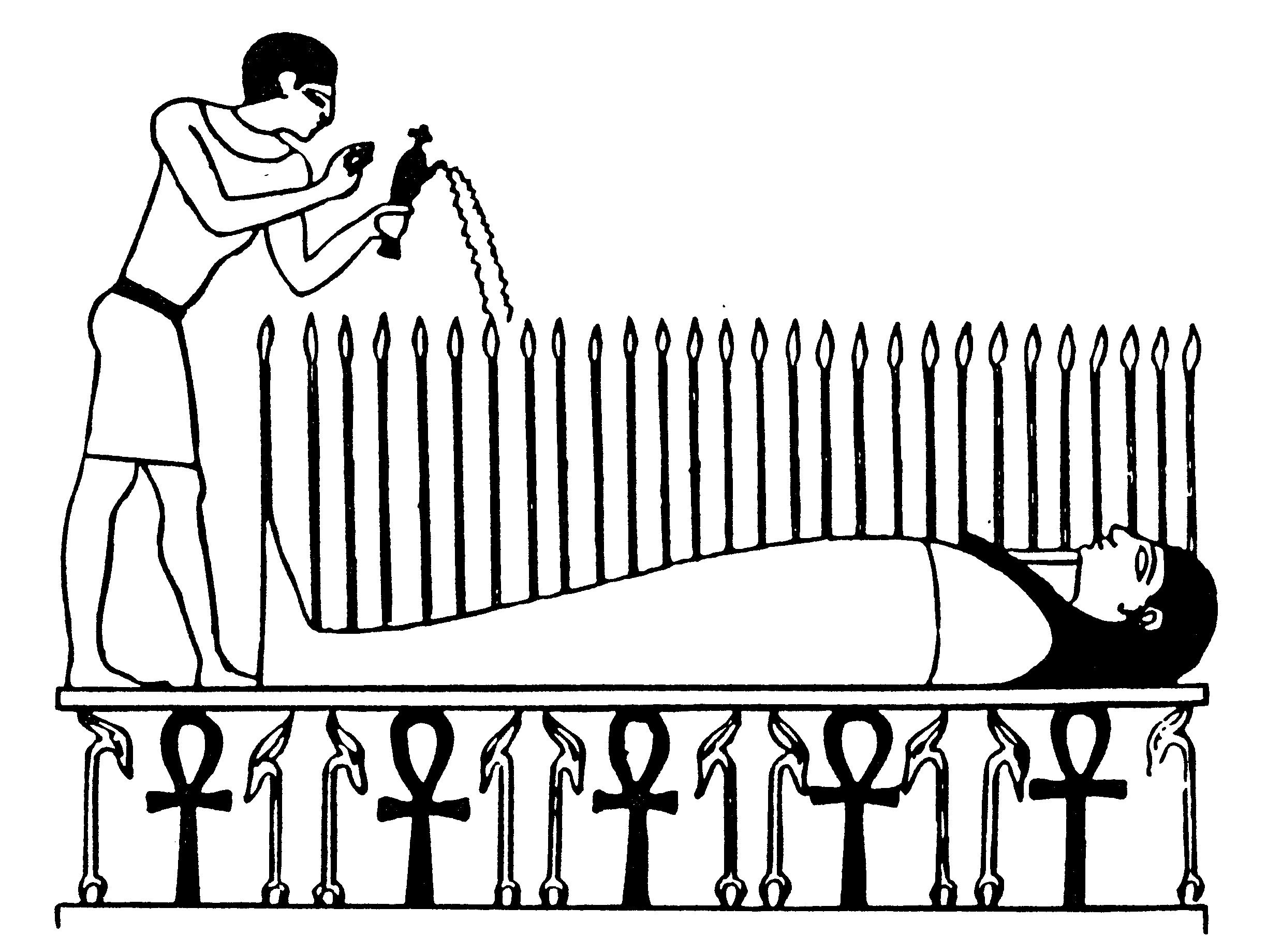
Watering the cereals on the figurine. The twenty-eight shoots symbolise the days of a lunar month and the age of Osiris when he died (Philae temple).

During the rites of the month of Khoiak, the rebirth of Osiris is celebrated through plant growth by germinating barley grains which have previously been mixed with earth placed in a gold mummiform mold (Khentymentyou figurine ) . For several days, from the twelve to the twenty-first Khoiak, the soil is regularly watered by officiants until the young shoots appear. The growth of the plants is suddenly interrupted when the plant figurine is embalmed. This germination rite, in the current state of knowledge, has been attested in the funerary domain since the First Intermediate Period. Under the 11th Dynasty, it was customary to place ceramic dishes pierced with holes and seeded with sprouted barley grains in royal tombs. Later, under the New Kingdom, the practice continued in another form. In certain royal tombs, “vegetative beds” were discovered where grains were spread on a canvas stretched over a frame, vaguely reproducing the silhouette of Osiris. Five copies are known. The size of these beds varies, from 152 cm (Horemheb) to 202 cm (Tutankhamun). This difference shows that at the time of the 18th dynasty the rite was not yet fixed and standardized. In the Late Period, the ritual reached the tombs of individuals. Various molds have been discovered. These are hollowed-out rectangular bricks which reproduce the hollow silhouette of Osiris. Remains of potting soil and cereals show that these bricks were reserved for germination rites.

==== Nutrient cereals ====
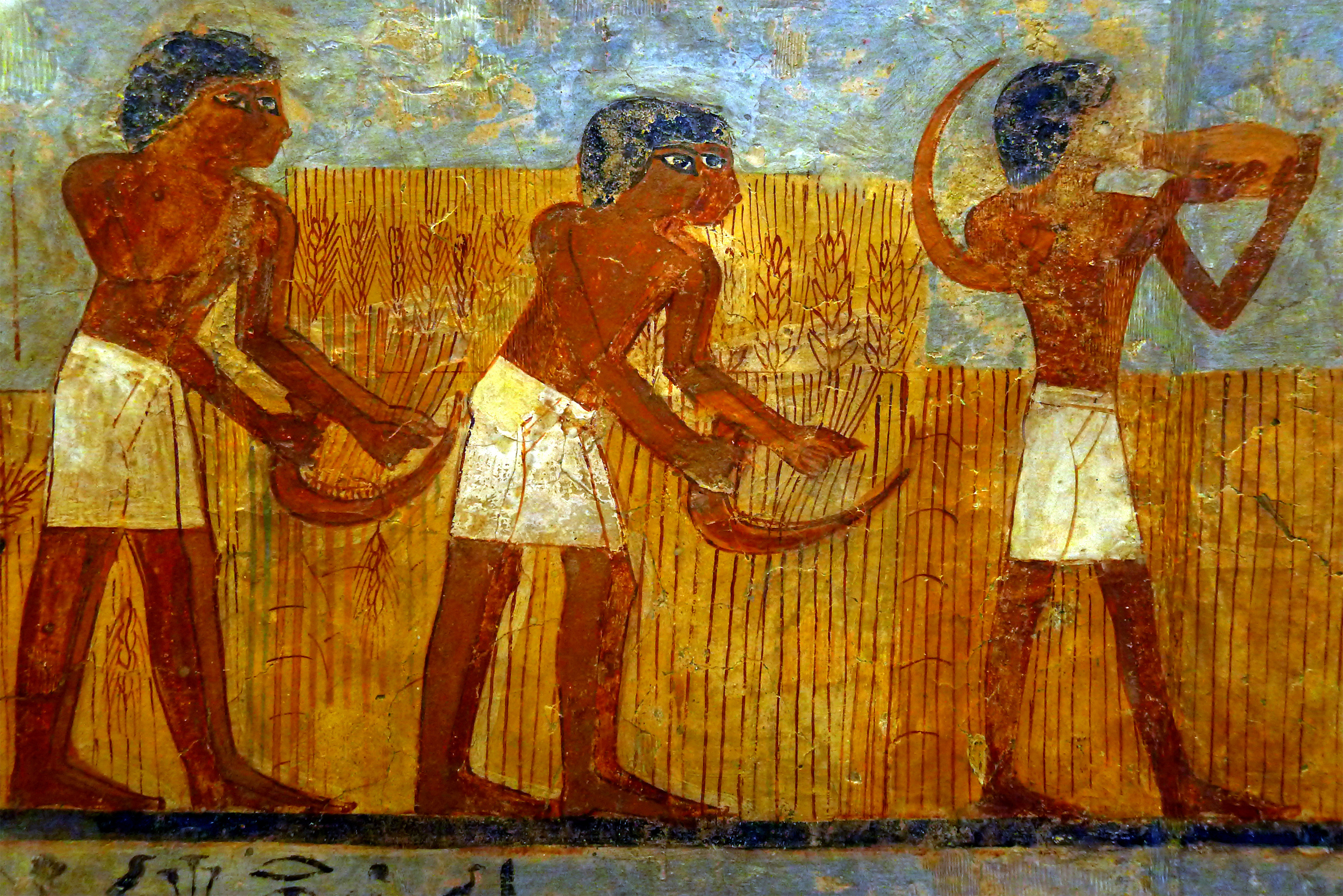
Harvest scene. Tomb of Ummu (18th dynasty), Musée du Louvre.

The rite of the “vegetating Osiris” is a reflection of Egyptian theological thought. In the late Old Kingdom, in the Pyramid Texts, the god Nepri personifies grain seeds as the raw material for bread, the staple food of the Nilotic population. Later, during the Middle Kingdom, the Texts of the sarcophagi demonstrate that Osiris, being associated with Nepri, then also took the form of a grain of cereal. However, grain is no longer seen only as food, but also as an illustration of the potential of plant life. After a very long period of dormancy, the seeds can indeed wake up on contact with water and germinate easily. The phenomenon of germination has been compared to the myth which makes Horus the posthumous son of Osiris born from the coupling of Isis with the mummy of the god. Even if he does not agree with this explanation, which he finds too crude, Plutarch reports that the Egyptians say "that Osiris is buried, when the grain that is sown is buried in the earth, and that this god reappears and lives again, when the sprouts begin to grow” and Isis notices that she is pregnant with Horus in the month when sowing begins ( On Isis and Osiris, 65). In chapter 269 of the Sarcophagus Texts, the life that comes out of the body of Osiris is compared to a sheaf of plants coming from grain. From it, loaves of bread are made which nourish men and, through offerings, the gods in the temples and the ancestors in the necropolises:

“N here is this sheaf of life which comes out of Osiris, which grows on the lips of Osiris, which gives life to men, which deifies the gods which spiritualizes the blessed, which nourishes the masters of the Kaou, masters of products, who makes pakou bread for the blessed, who makes the living prosper, who strengthens the body of the living. […] The love of N. here is in heaven, on earth, in the countryside. Isis is profitable to her Horus, for his friend that he is, for Horus. N. here lives again in Osiris. — Chapter 269 of the Sarcophagus Texts (extracts). Translation by Paul Barguet.

==== Ritual sowing ====
Book V of the Ritual of the Mysteries of Osiris provides details regarding the cultivation of barley, wheat and flax used by the officiants during the Khoiak ceremonies. These plants, once harvested, are intended for the germination of Khenti-Amentiu, for flour for kefen breads and for weaving funerary fabrics used for swaddling figurines. The pain- kefen, 28 centimeters long and flavored with twelve herbs, is a sort of synthesis of the sixteen disjointed members of Osiris. Before it is cooked, the names of the members are engraved on the dough; namely: head, feet, legs, arms, heart, chest, thigh, eye, fist, fingers, phallus, spine, ears, neck, ram's head and ourerit (word of unknown meaning). The bread was placed in a silver box and placed under the head of the Sokar figurine to accompany it in its burial.

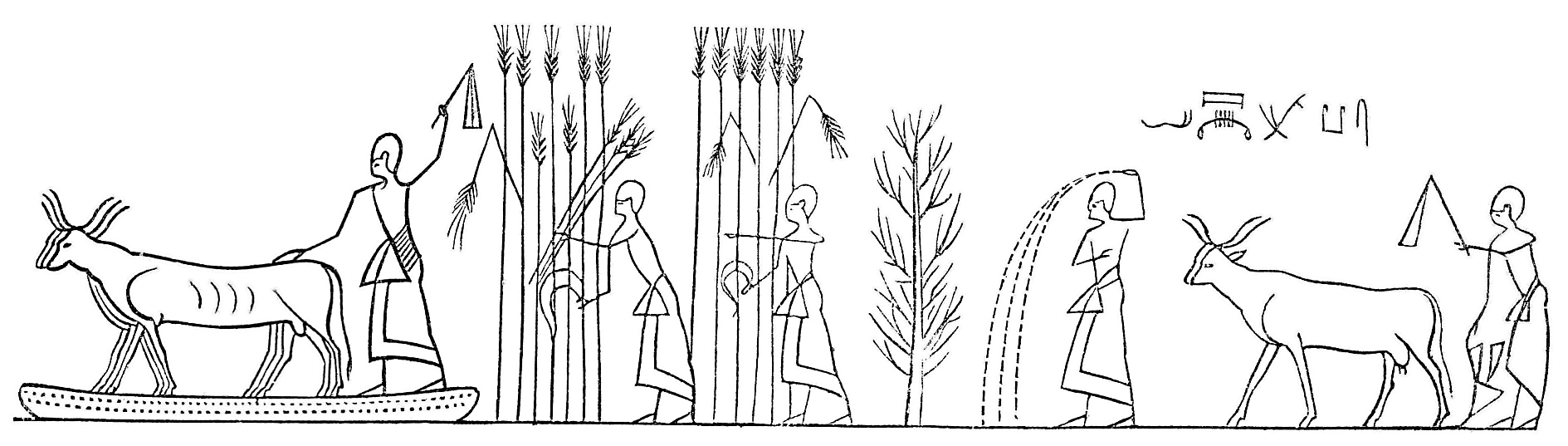
Scenes of agricultural work, sowing (right), harvesting (centre) and threshing (left). Illustration from chap. 110 of the Book of the Dead.

The sowing rite is not held in Khoiak, but the following month, between the twelfth and the nineteenth of Tobi . The text first describes the surface area of the sacred field (four aroures), then places particular emphasis on the plow used for plowing the plot. A young sower throws the seeds into the furrows. The seeds are immediately buried in the ground thanks to the passage of a plow which follows it closely. This scene is often depicted in tombs and in the Book of the Dead to illustrate the cycle of life. The harrowing of the grains is carried out with a plow pulled by two cows and whose plow is made of tamarisk wood and the share of black bronze. The tamarisk is a sacred tree often associated with Osiris. According to Plutarch, the body of Osiris was carried by the waters to the coasts of Byblos . There, the trunk of a tamarisk would have enveloped the remains in order to hide and protect them (On Isis and Osiris, §15.). According to the British Egyptologist John Gardner Wilkinson (1797-1875), in holy cities with an Osirian tomb such as Diospolis Parva, this tree was chosen to shade the tumulus containing the underground sepulcher.

We bring a pair of black cows whose yoke is made of ima wood . Their plow is made of tamarisk and its share of black bronze. A man is behind her, both hands on the plow, the cow- kherit and the cow- merit obeying his voice. His clothes are made of green fabric; a headband surrounds his head. A child precedes him who throws the seeds, the juvenile loop attached to his head. His tunic is also made of green fabric. The two cows are wearing a headband. The chief ritualist priest recites the Fertilize the Country formulas in accordance with the ritual of the festival. — Ritual of the Mysteries of Osiris, Book V, 60-62. Translation by Émile Chassinat reviewed by Sylvie Cauville.

=== Earth ===
==== Sand of the divine necropolises ====
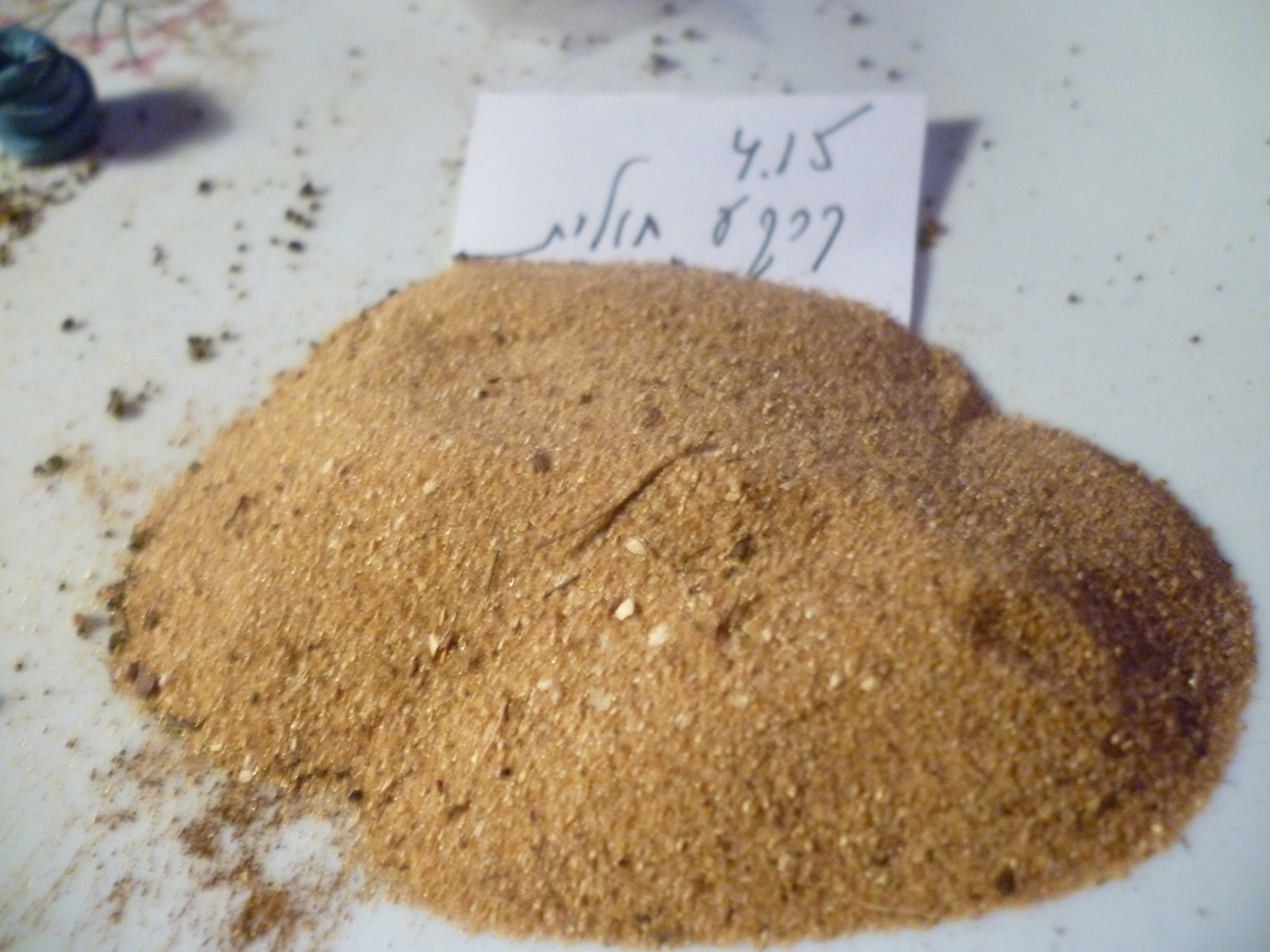
The figurine is made from earth taken from sacred places.

Of the three recipes set out in the Ritual of the Mysteries of Osiris, only the first (Book III, 33) specifies the nature and origin of the earth used as an ingredient for the figurine. Laconically, the text indicates that it is a “grainy earth of divine necropolises^{.} ”These necropolises ( iaout netjeryout, literally, the “divine mounds”) are clearly the sacred places where the figurines of previous years are buried. Further on (book V, 80), the text indeed speaks of the “crypt under the balanites which is in the divine necropolis, one enters with the mystical work of the previous year”. If the origin of the earth is certain, its nature remains debated. The translation of the words ta sher as “grainy earth” is not based on certain data, the second word not being attested elsewhere. However, it is clearly an epithet intended to clarify the nature of the earth. The necropolises in question being located on the edge of the desert, it seems quite likely that the earth used was dry and sandy. This land, whatever its real nature, had, in the eyes of the Egyptian officiants, a particular mystical virtue drawn from the holy places where it had been taken.

==== Myth of sacred territories ====
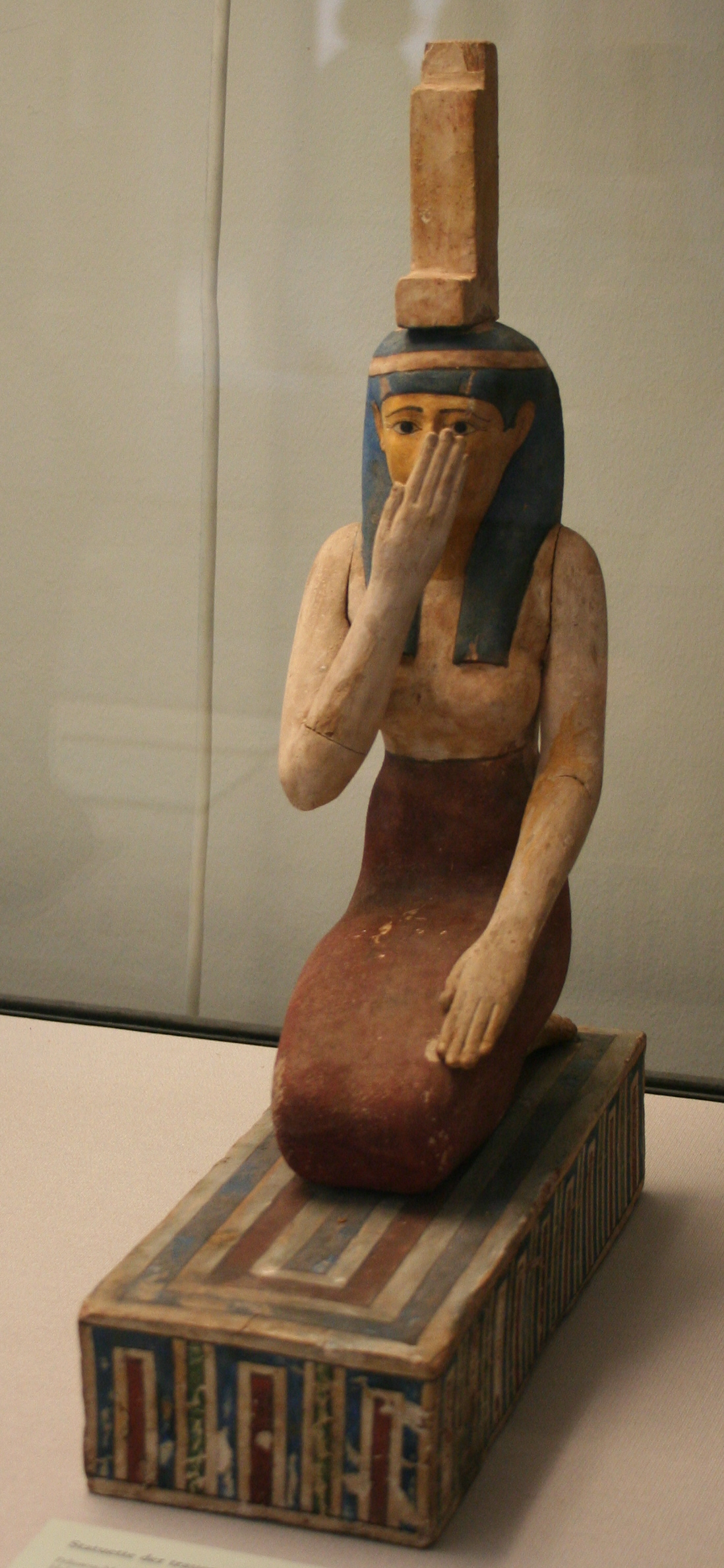
Statuette of Isis in mourning for Osiris (Roemer and Pelizaeus Museum, Hildesheim).

The Papyrus Salt 825 or Ritual for the preservation of life, dated from the 4th century BC, offers some details as to the lands used for the manufacture of the figurine of Osiris-Sokar. This magical text is now very incomplete and very difficult to analyze. It is probably a ritual performed at the beginning of the year between the seventeenth and twenty-fourth of the month of Thout . The ritual implemented is perhaps a conjuration intended to ward off sudden death or assassination from the pharaoh. From a mythological point of view, the papyrus evokes the murder of Osiris as well as the cosmic disorder that resulted, such as the stopping of the Luminaries in the sky and the grief of the gods. As in the month of Khoiak, the ceremonial requires the creation of a figurine of Osiris where many products come into play. The author of the text, undoubtedly an Abydean priest of great erudition, postulates that the effectiveness of these products (earth, minerals and plants) derives from their mythological origins, each product being born from an emanation (saliva, sweat, tear or blood) of the gods Ra, Geb, Isis, Nephthys and Set during the period of trouble caused by the murder of Osiris. Two types of lands are distinguished, noble lands resulting from the tears of the grieving gods and cursed lands resulting from the blood of Set, the murderer, pursued by Horus, son of Osiris and avenger of his father:

The land of the Temple of the Primordial Stone (Heliopolis), the land of Letopolis. Ra sat inside them. His sweat fell there. The land of Tchenenet (Memphis), Ptah sat inside her. His sweat fell there. The land of the City of Fish (Abydos), the land of the Temple of Foods, Osiris sat within them. His sweat fell there. The land of the two caves of the City of the Elephant (Elephantine), is […].

The land of Oxyrhinque (Ouabouab), the land of the City of Gold (Ombos), the land of Sou, the land of the Oasis of Barieh, the land of the Oasis of kargeh, the blood of Set fell inside them. These areas are his.

— Extracts from Papyrus Salt 825 ( III ,4- III ,7 and V ,1- V ,2). Translation by André Fermat.

=== Dates ===
==== Osirian fruits ====
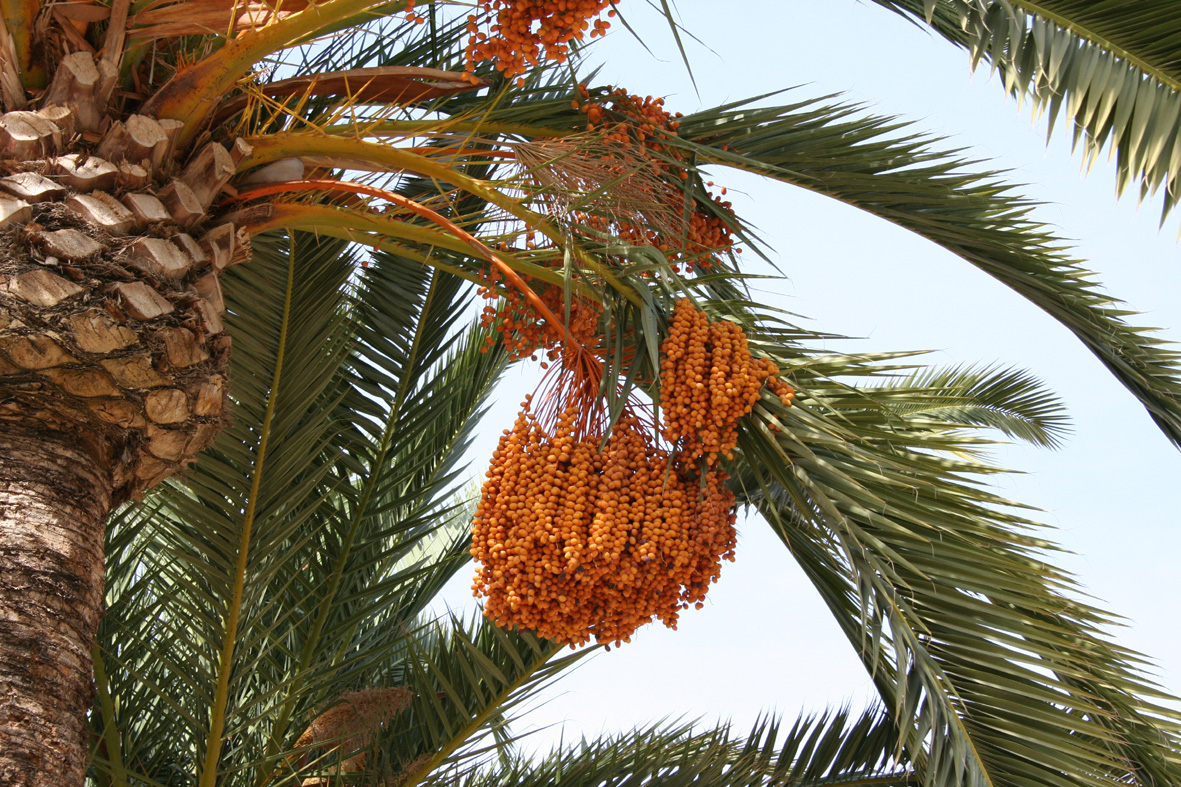
Date palm

After the granular earth, date pulp is the second major ingredient of the Sokar figurine. From the beginnings of Egyptian civilization, the date palm was seen as a mediator between the underground and terrestrial worlds. In its natural state, the palm grows in hot areas of the desert, far from the flood-prone lands of the banks of the Nile. However, its roots plunge very deep into the ground so that it never runs out of water. It is also in permanent contact with the water table considered by the ancient Egyptians as a manifestation of the Noun, the chaotic ocean of origins. Its fruits mature between July and September, at the time of the Nile flood. The palm therefore provides food when the waters cover the fields and when the refreshing Etesian winds blow. Symbolically the arrival of dates marks the end of the hot season characterized by the low flow of the river and the end of food reserves. According to the Jumilhac Papyrus, date palms are the plant manifestation of Osirian lymphs:

As for the entrance to the house of palm trees, it is the lymphs that grew as palm trees. As for the place of the flood, it is the divine lymphs which are in this place. May the Double Country be flooded thanks to them, to support the inhabitants of Duat and the men. — Papyrus Jumilhac, VIII, 20-23. Translation by Frédéric Servajean.

==== Offerings to Osiris ====
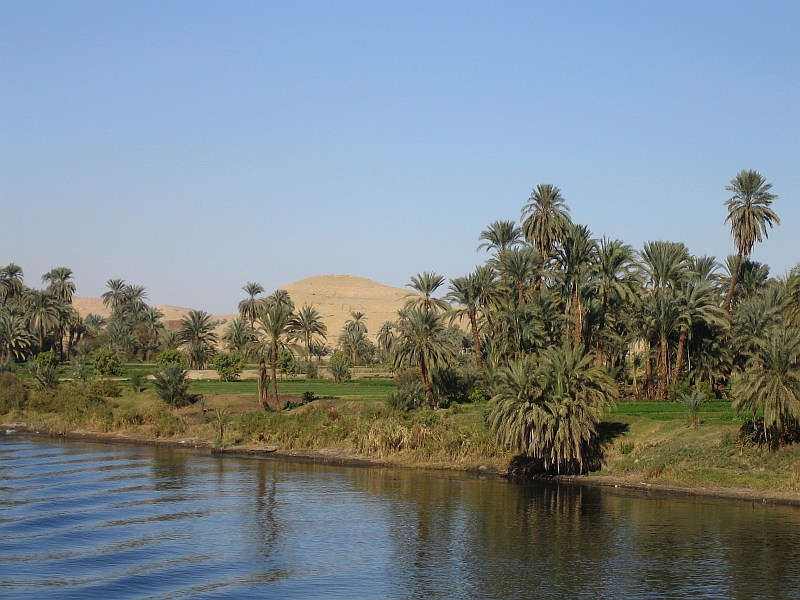
Egyptian landscape (Theban region).

In Ptolemaic temples, rich in cultic representations, the pharaoh is shown making offerings of dates to Osiris (a gesture which is reserved for Osiris alone). (Note: More than 180 different offerings and rituals have been recorded, cf. Cauville 2011. The same author devoted an article to this offering: S. Cauville, "Une offrande spécifique à Osiris: le récipient de dattes", Revue d'Égyptologie, vol. 32, 1980, pp. 47-68.) The present is represented in the form of a small box topped with a pyramid and containing compressed dates. By presenting him with these fruits, the sovereign magically restores Osiris's lost lymphs and helps to have him resurrected by Isis and the other gods. The restitution of the lymphs, through the dates, is crucial because when they rejoin the body of the murdered god, the engine of the cycle of nature continues to function in an eternal movement of loss and restitution:

Present the container of dates: Take the emanations coming from Geb, the secret substances coming from your body agglomerate protecting you. — words of the pharaoh to Osiris.

I fertilize the branches of all the trees and I supply the sanctuaries — response of Osiris to the pharaoh.

=== Precious minerals ===
==== Metaphor of divine essence ====
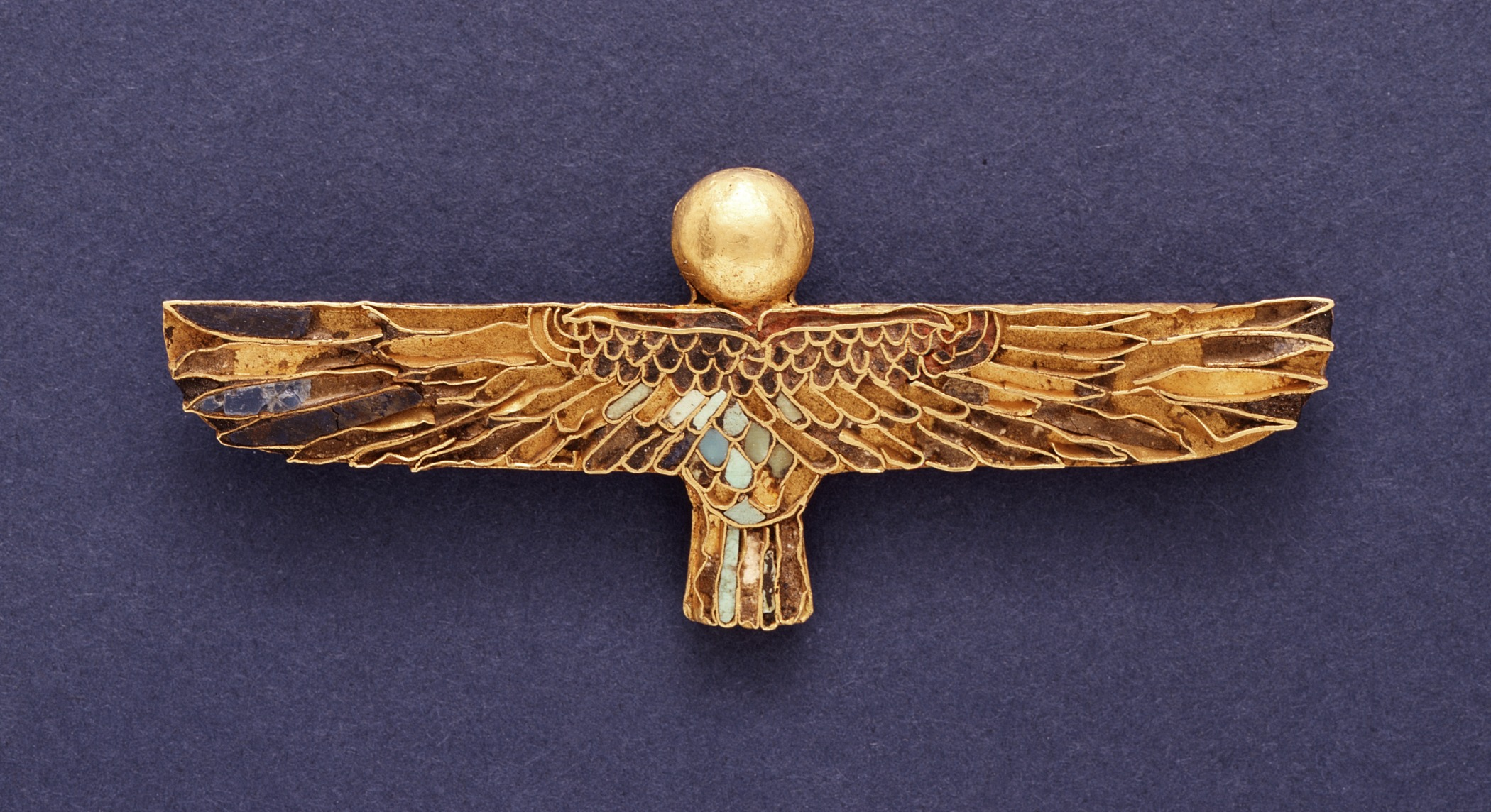
Ptolemaic gold amulet with lapis lazuli, turquoise and steatite inlay (Los Angeles County Museum of Art).

The Sokar figurine contains twenty-four precious products taken from the mineral world. (Note: By the term âaout, the ancient Egyptians meant a range of precious products such as metals, minerals and resins.) This number (24 = 8×3) is a multiple of three and a symbol of plurality. It constitutes an image of the countless riches hidden in the bowels of the desert mountains which border the Nile valley. From the texts of the pyramids, it appears that the Egyptians perceived minerals and metals, but also medicinal plants, the glow of the stars (stars, sun, moon, planets) and their cosmic cycles as proof of the existence of the divine. Their empirical knowledge of the universe, acquired and developed since Prehistory, was expressed in religious and funerary texts in metaphorical and poetic forms. In some hymns, divine forces are described as the essence of minerals extracted from the underworld. A passage from the Bremmer-Rhind Papyrus contains a description of Osiris in the form of a being rejuvenated by the grace of minerals. These stanzas are addressed to the revivified god by two extras playing the roles of Isis and Nephthys between the twenty-second and twenty-six Khoiak in Abydos:

For you are a god from a god.

O Mekaty, nothing exists apart from you!

Your hair is turquoise… as you return from the fields of turquoise;

Your hair is lapis lazuli, it belongs to lapis lazuli,

Lapis lazuli is on your hair;

The color of your limbs is that of Upper Egyptian copper;

Your bones are fashioned by silver.

Because you are a new child.

Your vertebrae are turquoise.

Or: The scent of your hair is that of incense which arises from itself,

What is on your hair is lapis lazuli,

Geb carries the offerings for you,

He places first the god he begat .

— Stances of the two birds. Translation by Claire Lalouette

==== Mineral mythology ====
Table of symbolic equivalences ^{152}
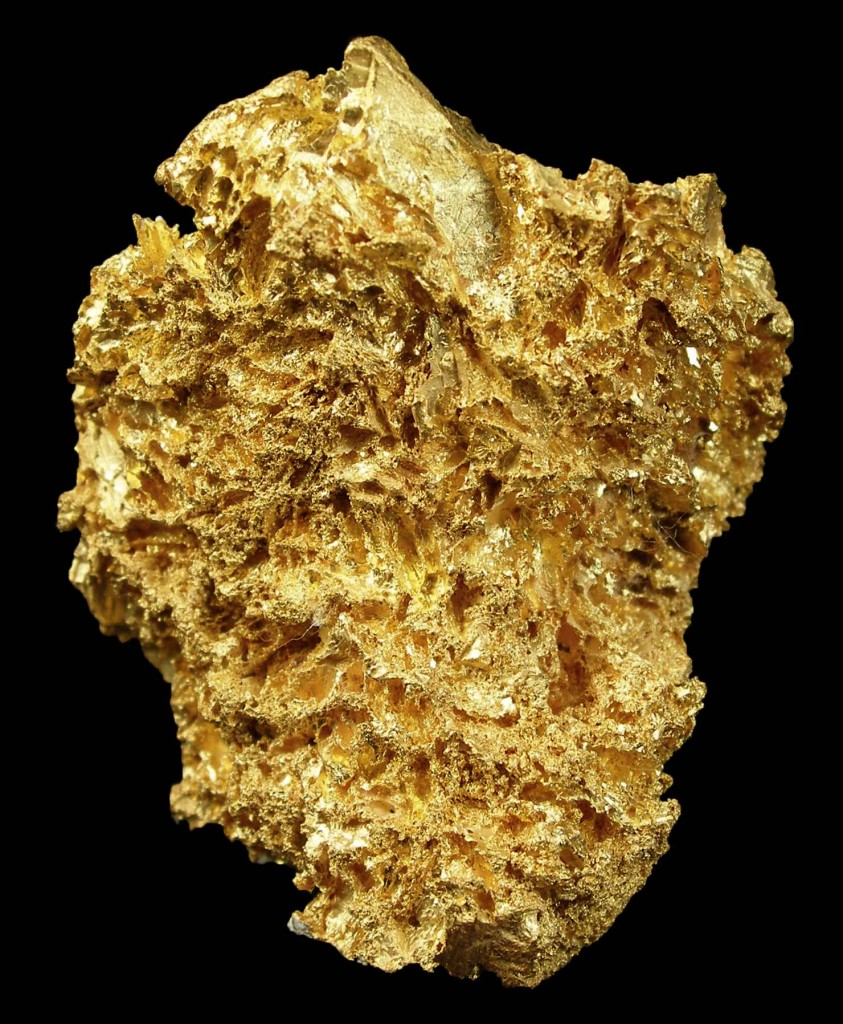
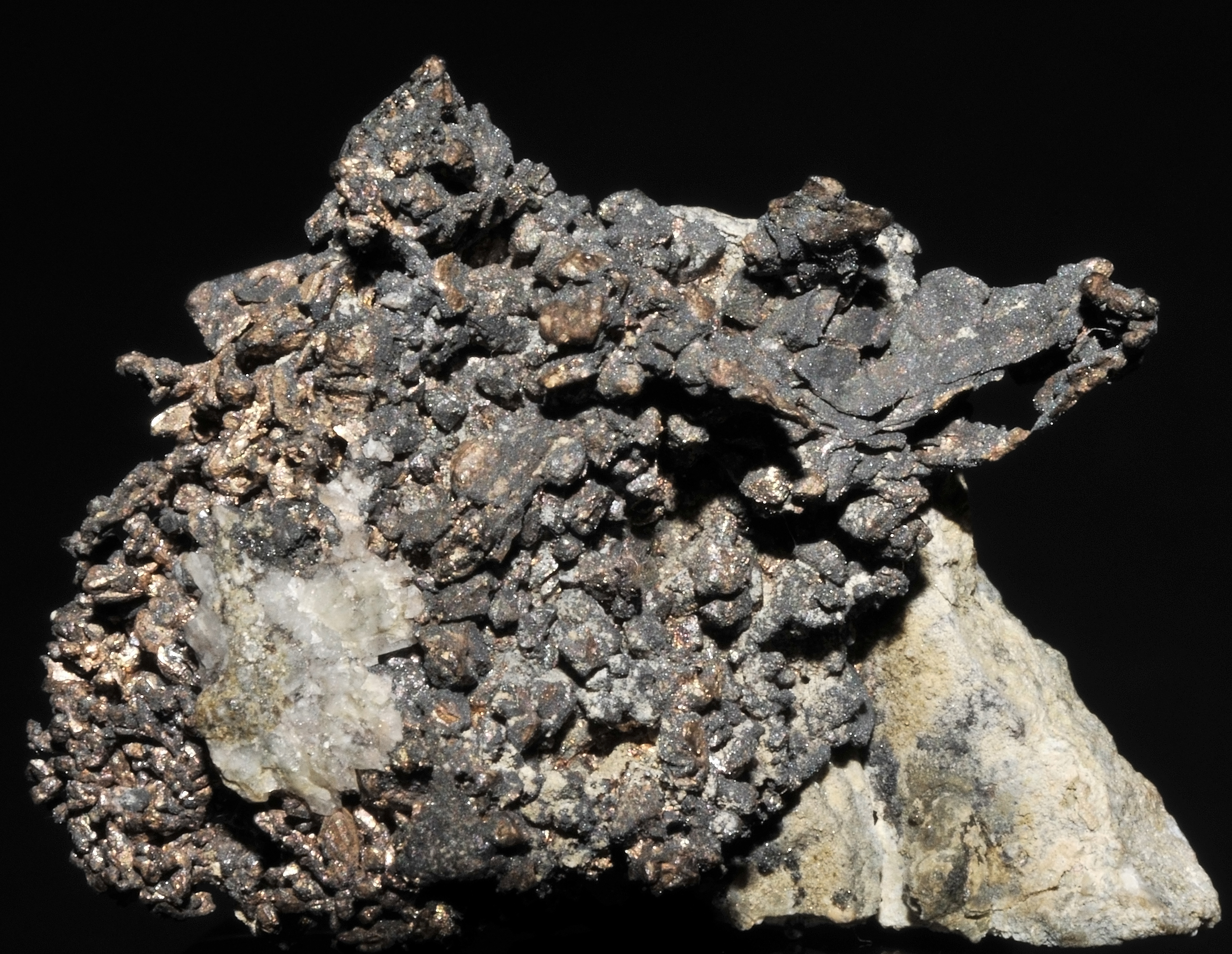
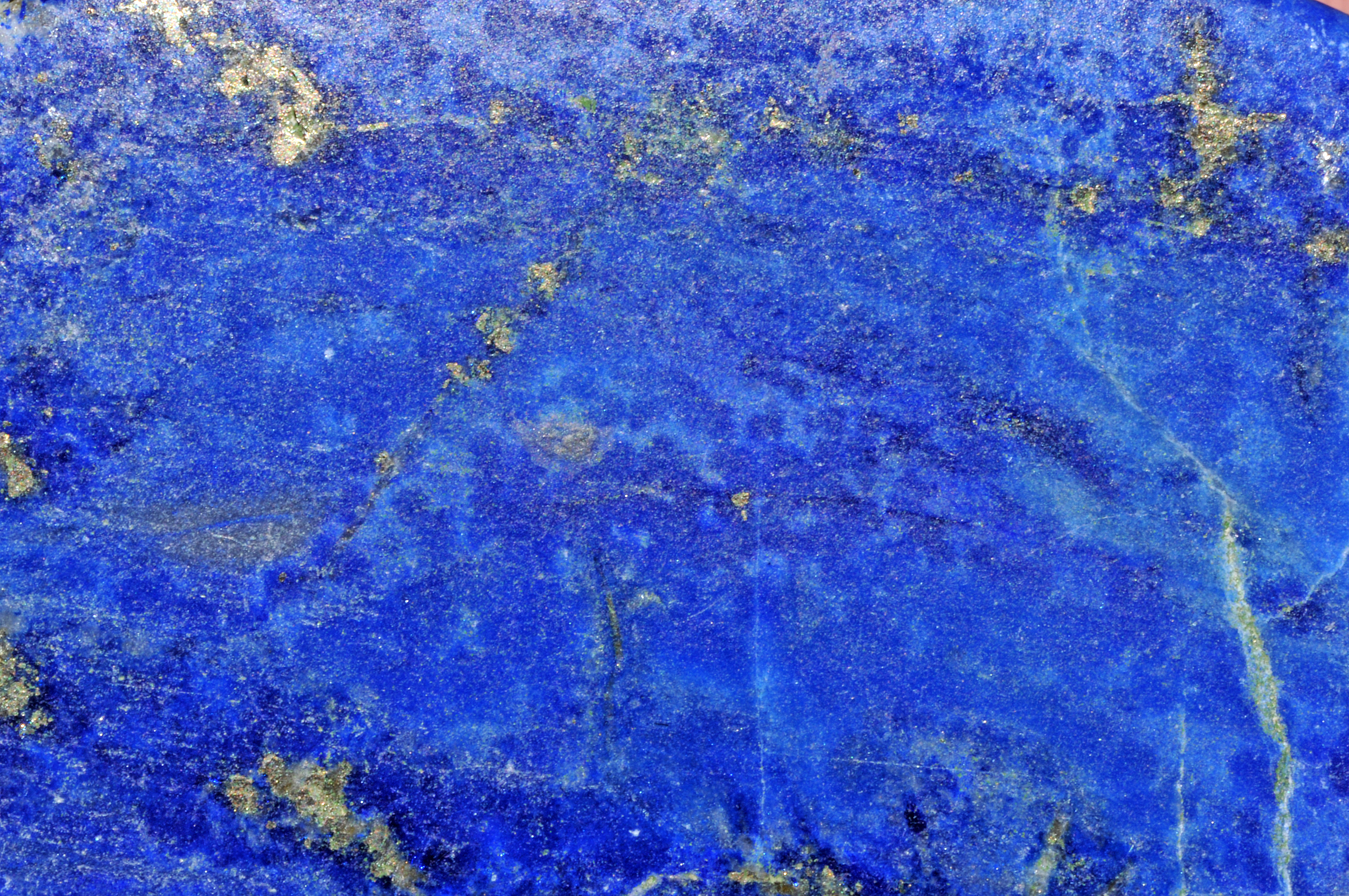
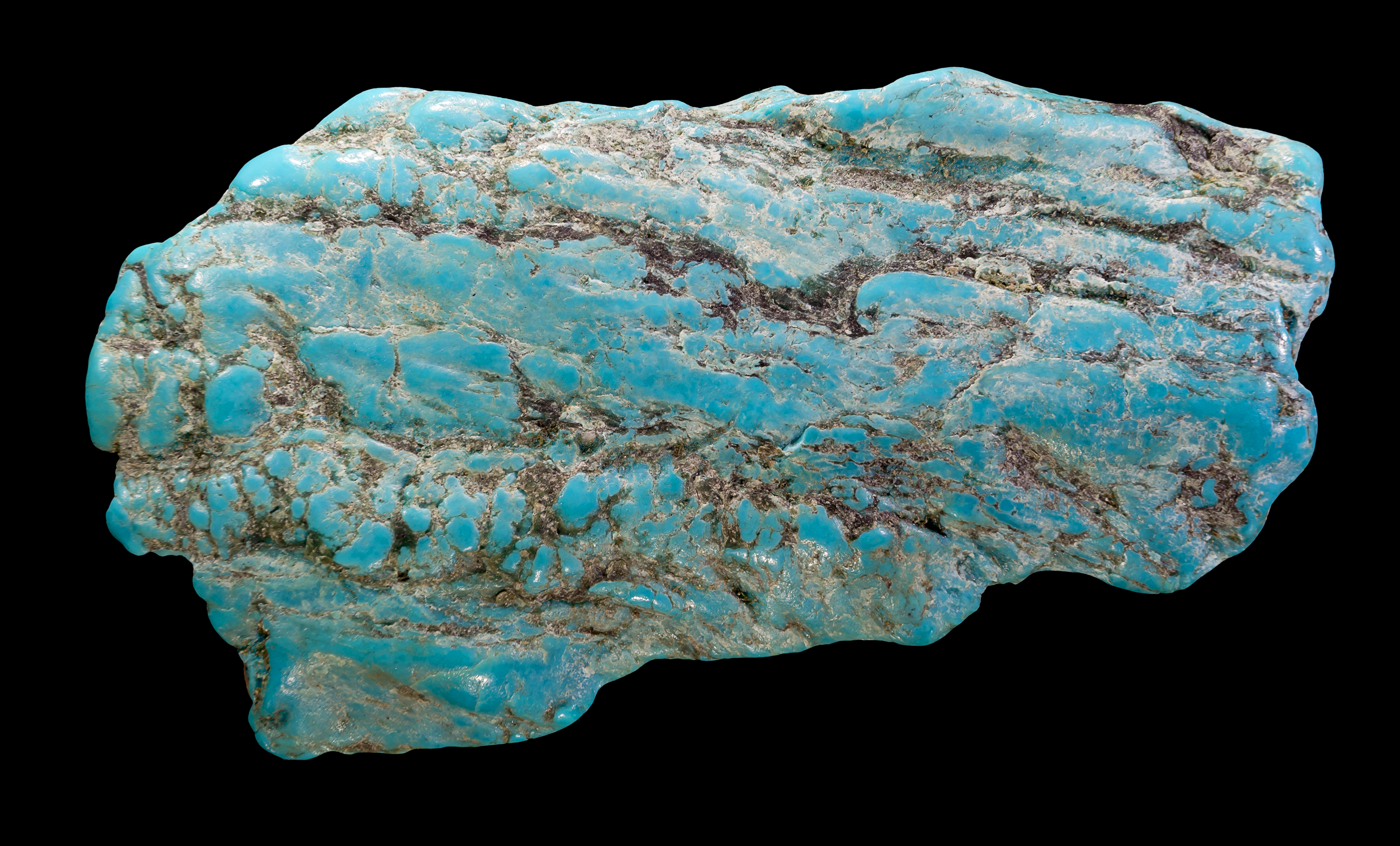
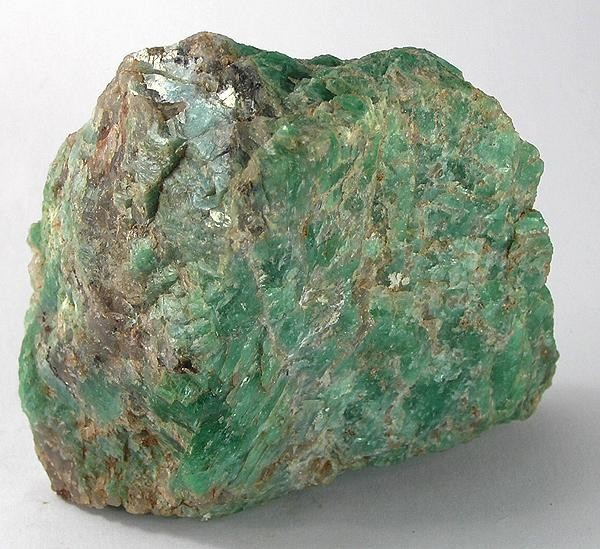
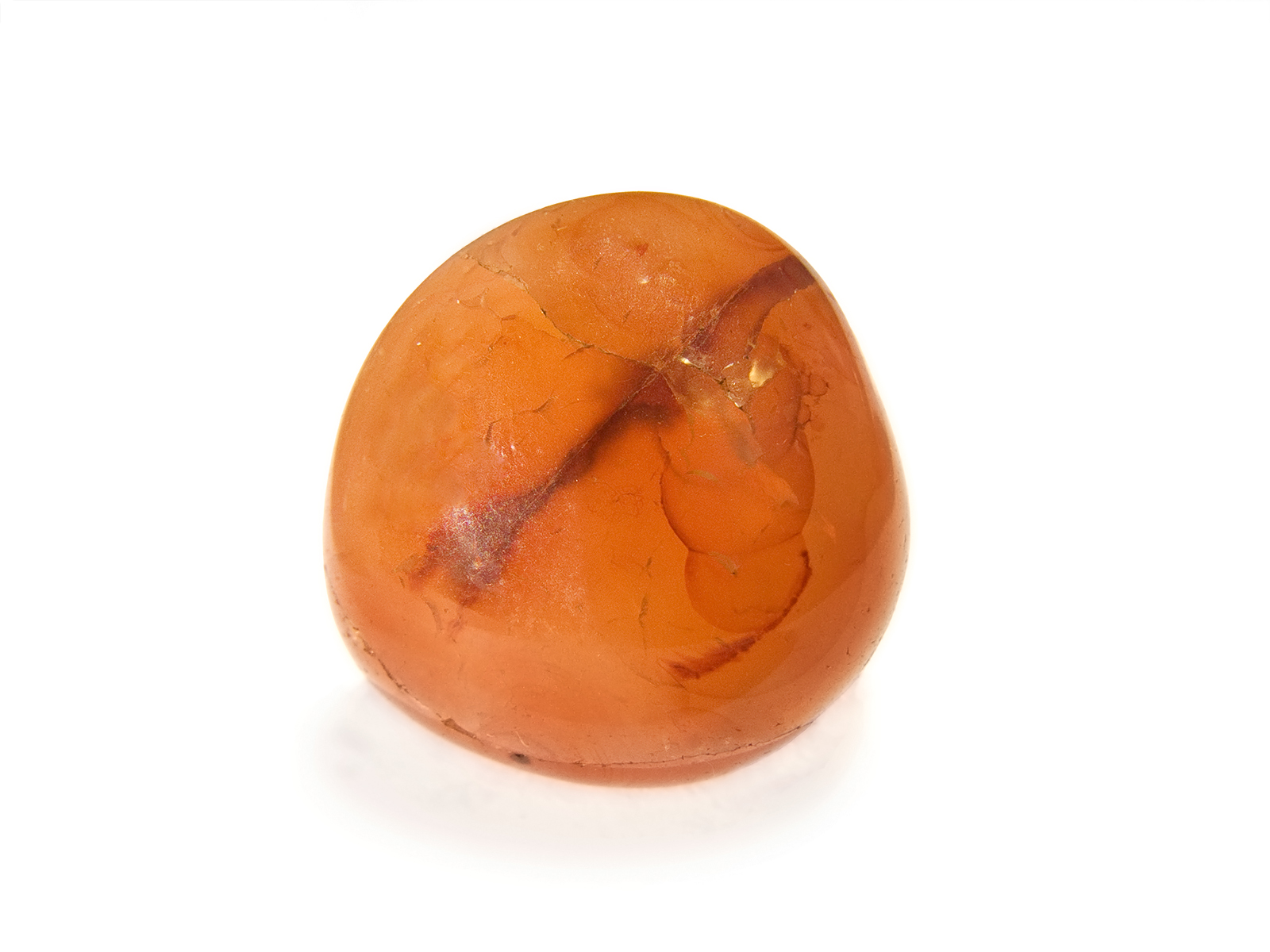
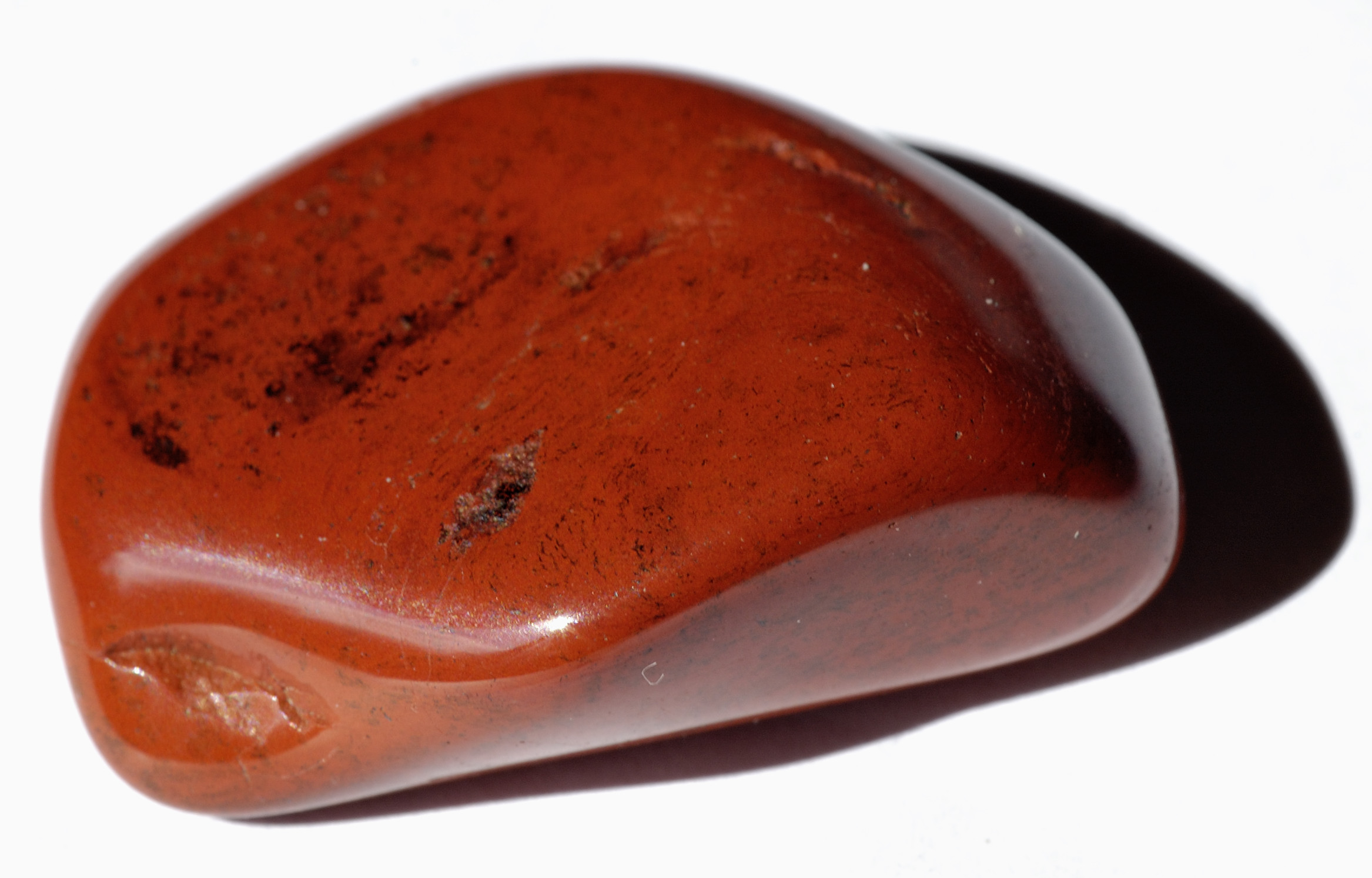
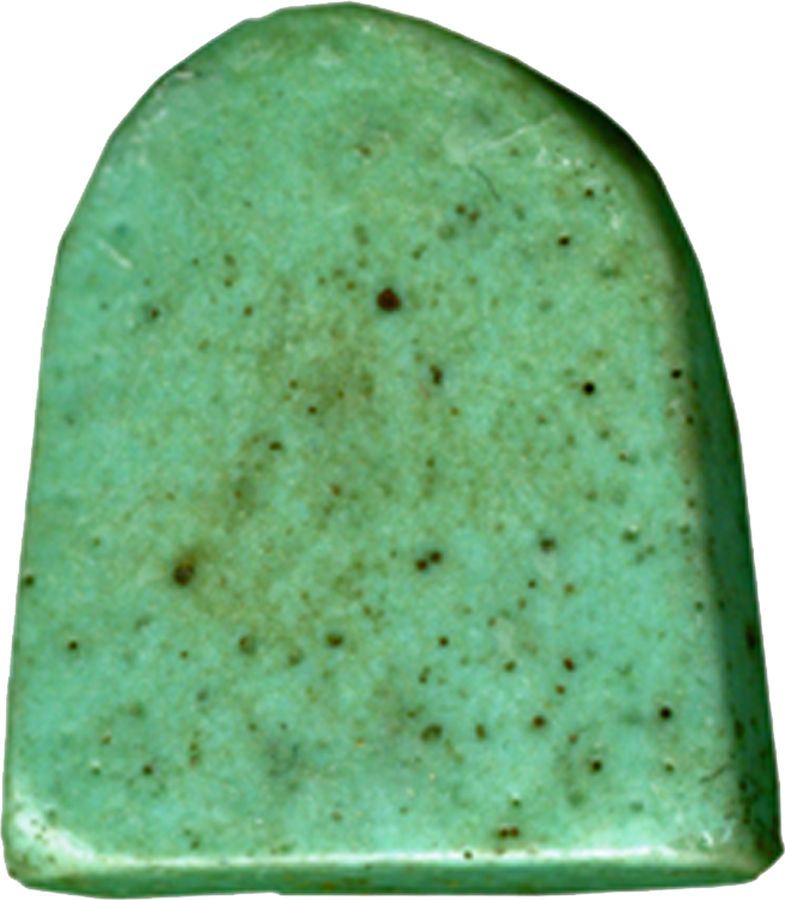
Product	Image	Light	Concept	Color
Gold		Sun	Day	YELLOW
Silver		Moon	Night	White
Lapis-lazuli		Night	Regeneration	Dark blue
Turquoise		Dawn	Birth Renaissance	Light blue Green
Feldspar green		Vegetable green	Growth	True green
Carnelian		Fire	Destruction	Red
Red jasper		Blood	Destruction	Red
Self-glazing fries		Flicker	Faint glow Greening	Pale green

Egypt is a land of contrasts where the Nile Valley constitutes a thriving oasis within the desert. To the west, the Libyan Desert, territory of the god Set, is deeply hostile. To the east, the mountains of the Arabian Desert concentrate the majority of mineral resources. This location of mining operations profoundly influenced Egyptian thought. Despite the hostility of the desert, the Egyptians did not hesitate to exploit its resources. Many hymns associate deities with mining activity such as Min in Coptos perceived as the protector of caravan routes, Hathor described in Dendera as Lady of turquoise and amethyst, Nemty who in the 12th nome of Upper Egypt watches over on the production of silver ore or Horus in Edfu which is assigned to the production of gold.

The mineral components of the Sokar figurine reflect a set of metaphors where each of the products used occupies a precise place in Egyptian thought. Solar gold and lunar silver form a couple where the first is the flesh of the gods and the second their bones. Turquoise (light lunar blue) and lapis lazuli (a dark blue evoking the night sky) form another complementary pair. This mineral duo evokes the two alternative aspects of the Moon (visibility and invisibility) of the Great Goddess who sometimes takes the features of Isis - Chentayt the mourning wife and sometimes the features of the sensual Hathor . Divine power is evoked by the metals used to forge cutting weapons such as iron and copper . Dangerous deities can also be evoked by their flint or obsidian claws .

==== Mineral and astral lights ====
In the poetic and religious framework, the Egyptians forged a close relationship between the world of minerals and the overall functioning of the universe. Coming from the desert East, the minerals have been linked to the cyclical appearance of stars moving in the sky from east to west: the sun, the Moon, the stars, and the thirty-six decanal constellations. Two kinds of opposing but complementary lights have been distinguished, an active celestial light (the stars that illuminate) subject to the cycles of time and an inactive underground light (the sparkling minerals) but eternal and immutable. The stars have a limited luminous lifespan, they appear in the Eastern Horizon then die in the Western Horizon. When the stars disappear into the underworld, they come into contact with minerals and draw their lasting light from them. Regenerated by this contact, the stars begin a new journey in the sky ^{154} .

Painting of the two lights
Sky	Earth
Active and cyclical light	Inactive and permanent light
Astres	Minerals
Time- neheh	Immutability- Djet
Road	Osiris
Mobile Base Soul	Immobile mummy

== Symbolism of the reunion of the relics ==
The process of Osiris' regeneration is integrated into a vast symbolic discourse. The reconstitution of his dismembered body is compared to the unification of the Egyptian territory made up of forty-two regions, but also, and above all, to the reconstitution of the lunar star during the fourteen days of the ascending phase. The desired goal is the agrarian prosperity of the country linked to the annual return of the Nile flood.

=== Territorial reunification ===
==== Forty-two nomes ====
During the month of Khoiak, the ritual recomposition of the body of Osiris is part of the Egyptian conception of national geography. There is, on the one hand, the country as a whole, the dual kingdom of Upper and Lower Egypt and, on the other, the numerous regions and cities that make it up. Each relic, as part of the body of Osiris, is the basis of provincial specificities. According to certain religious monographs, such as the Papyrus Jumilhac, each provincial temple has established close links between its relic and the mythical history of the province concerned (Abydos with the head, Philæ with the left leg, Mendes with the phallus, etc...). However, this strong local anchorage did not prevent the relic from being perceived as a piece of a unique body ensemble. The Osirian rites of Khoiak are part of a national dynamic where each relic has the purpose of joining the reassembled body of Osiris. In this unifying perspective, the recomposition of Osiris' body is compared to the process of unification of the Egyptian kingdom by Pharaoh. The latter, like the valiant Horus, replaces Isis in the quest for the disjointed members of the murdered god. In the Osireion of Dendera, this political process is illustrated in the Canopic Procession, where the Pharaoh leads a procession of forty-two relic bearers towards his father Osiris. The body of Osiris is very clearly compared to Egyptian territory, where each relic is seen as the capital of one of the forty-two provinces:

“I bring you the divine court of Upper Egypt in its entirety and your divine relics, they are complete in their places. I bring you the capitals of the nomes to be your body parts, the divine shreds to be your body - your secret representation - the divine relics are the gods of the nomes in their own form. […]

I bring you the fundamental gods of Lower Egypt gathered together and all your body parts, they are assembled for the Temple-of-Gold. I bring you the capitals of the nomes: it is your body, it is your ka which is with you. I bring you your name, your soul, your shadow, your material form, your image and your capitals of nomes.

— Procession of the canopic glasses, the two speeches of the Pharaoh. Translation by Sylvie Cauville.

==== Centipede Legs ====
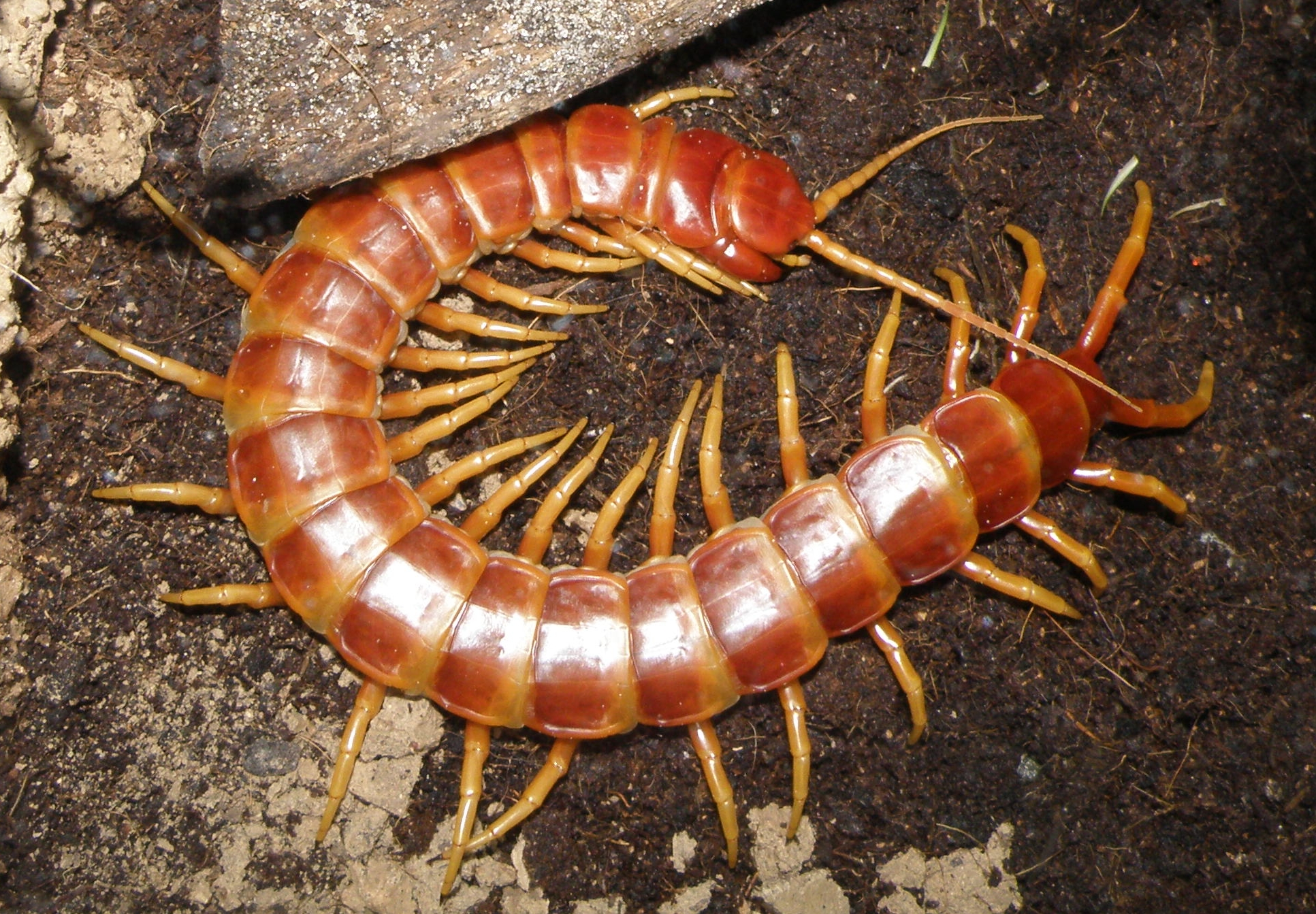
Scolopendre

The ancient Egyptians deified the scolopendre, or "centipede", to propitiate an animal whose bite could be dangerous to humans. The Egyptian specimens (Scolopendra adhœrens) are large, measuring almost 25 centimeters ^{157} . From the Pyramid Texts, it appears that in Heliopolis, the animal is venerated under the name Sepa. Egyptian priests noticed that in reality, the centipede had forty-two legs divided into twenty-one pairs. Through a play of assonances, this animal has been linked to Osiris and the phenomenon of the flooding of the Nile. In the Egyptian language, the same root is the basis of the words sepa "centipede", sepat "nome" and sepy "flap" and close (by metathesis) to the word psed "spine". In an allegorical way, the forty-two legs of the centipede came to evoke the forty-two shreds scattered throughout the forty-two nomes of the kingdom with the spine of Osiris (the Nile), as a link between the different parts. Under the Old Kingdom, this union of the forty-two parts took the form of a royal palanquin (or sedan chair) hoisted on the shoulders of twenty bearers. With the two legs of the chief carrier, this gives forty-two human legs intended to convey Pharaoh during the solemn festivals. In the late period, Sepa is a divinity assigned to the rising waters of the Nile, in particular at Kherâha (ancient Cairo), where a mythical cave opened each year in order to raise the flood. The unifying and life-giving functions of Sepa led to a close rapprochement with Anubis, the god of mummifiers.

=== Lunar phases ===
==== Osiris-Moon ====
If ancient Egypt is best known for having celebrated the Sun through the god Ra, the Moon also holds an important place in mythological thought. Its cycle has been the subject of numerous pre-scientific observations and analyses. In the Egyptian language, the Moon, Ioh, is a word of the masculine gender. Several male deities have thus personified the nocturnal star such as the famous Thoth, Khonsou and Min and the more discreet Douaou, the “Morning”. The lunar aspects of Osiris appear, in the form of discreet allusions, from the pyramid texts. In the New Kingdom, the assimilation of Osiris to the Moon is a very explicit belief, as it appears on a stele erected at Abydos by Ramesses IV:

You are the moon in the sky, and you grow young as you wish and you grow old when you want. There you go out to drive away the darkness, anointed and clothed by the Ennead, and then incantations are uttered to glorify their majesty […] — Hymn to Osiris, Abydean stele of Ramesses IV.

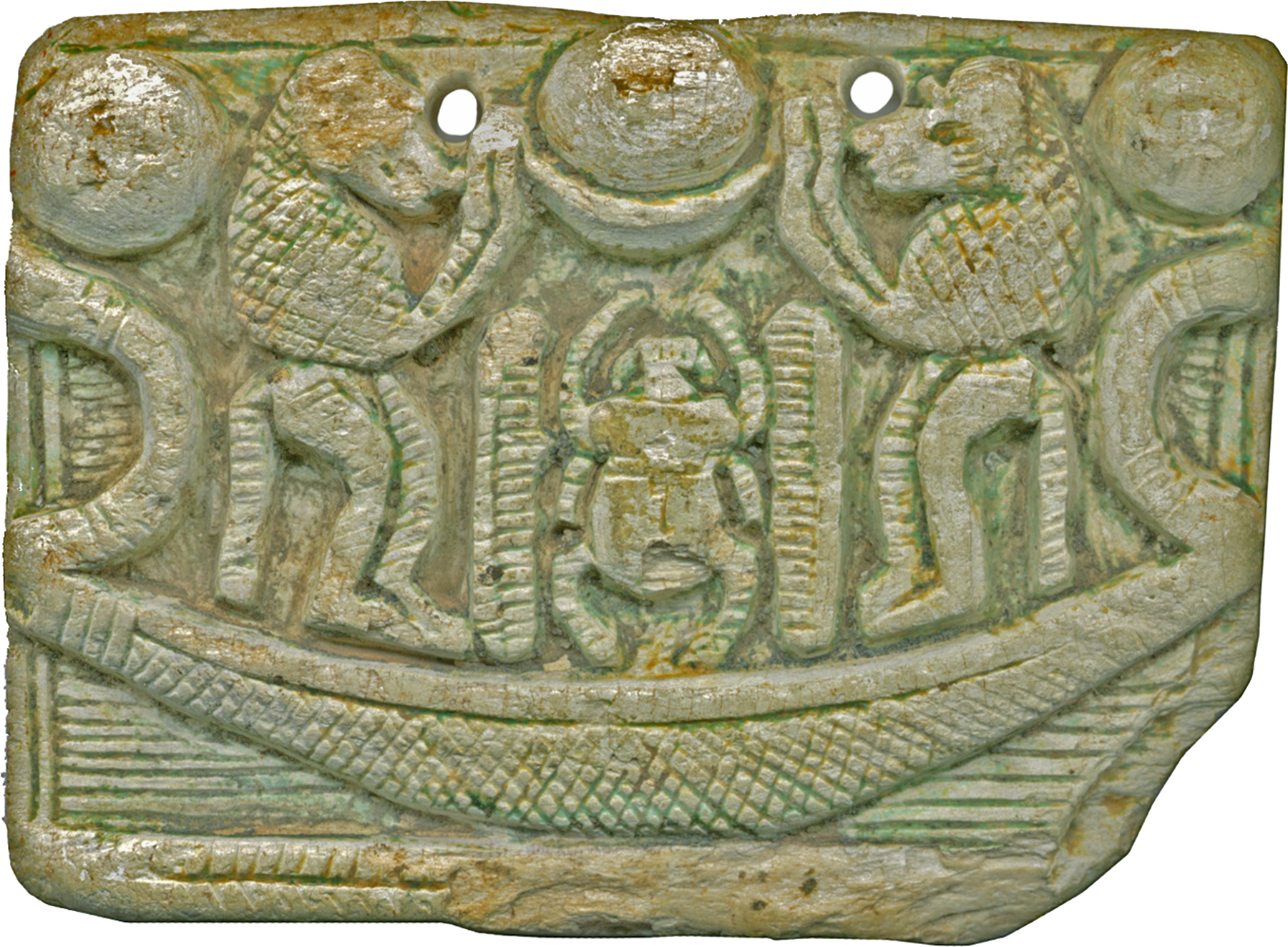
Night boat carrying the waxing moon adored by two monkeys (Walters Art Museum).

During the Ptolemaic era, Osiris-Moon was integrated into a very complex syncretistic theological system. In the Osirian chapels of Dendera, places where the rituals of the mysteries take place, the rebirth of the god Osiris is linked to that of the Moon:

Stand up on the evening boat, to see your body as the Moon, at the time of filling the wedjat-eye on the fifteenth day. Stand up straight, the jackal gods rejoice for you on either side of the Moon, as your light shines as burning Taurus. Rise up alive, in the eastern horizon, the doors of heaven open for you when they see you. Stand up in your boat, the Souls of the East adore you, the Monkeys honor you with praise. Stand up, bull of cows, who impregnate ladies, hearts rejoice for you at night. Stand up, you whose rays are bright, who light up the darkness, who make the night light up the earth with your rays. — Osiréion de Dédérah, Translation by Sylvie Cauville.

==== Filling the Wedjat Eye ====
For the ancient Egyptians, the lunar month began on the morning the Moon ceased to be visible, shortly before the new moon . The second day is when the crescent reappears in the sky and the fifteenth is that of the full moon . The most common mythological symbol is that of the Oudjat Eye or “Eye of Horus”. (Note: At Egyptian latitudes, the waxing and waning of the Moon resembles an eye whose eyelid opens and closes.) The waning phase of the Moon greatly concerned Egyptian theologians. The disappearance of the star was perceived as a cosmic disorder caused by hostile forces. Also, rites were developed to bring back the full moon and to avoid the total destruction of the star. The Egyptians were reluctant to talk about the disappearance of the Moon, but it appears that this phenomenon was perceived, among other things, as an injury inflicted by Seth to one of Horus eyes by throwing garbage in his face ( gloss of chapter 17 of the Book of the Dead ). In Philæ, the pharaoh offers myrrh to fifteen deities who in exchange promise to fill the eye with minerals and plants over which they exercise their power. In Dendera, the two rows of chapels of the Osiréion are symbolically joined by a staircase of fourteen steps leading to the terrace of the pronaos. Each step represents one of the days of the ascending phase of the Moon. This same staircase is represented on a ceiling inside the pronaos. The fourteen steps are climbed by fourteen deities in the direction of a holy Oudjat worshiped by Thoth. (Note: List of the fourteen deities, from the first to the fourteenth day: Montou, Atoum, Chou, Tefnout, Geb, Nout, Osiris, Isis, Horus son of Isis, Nephtys, Hathor of Dendérah, Horus of Edfou, Tanénet and Iounyt (Herbin 1982).) The Eye is represented in a complete lunar disk placed on a papyrus-shaped column.

Lunar staircase with fourteen steps (temple of Hathor of Dendera).

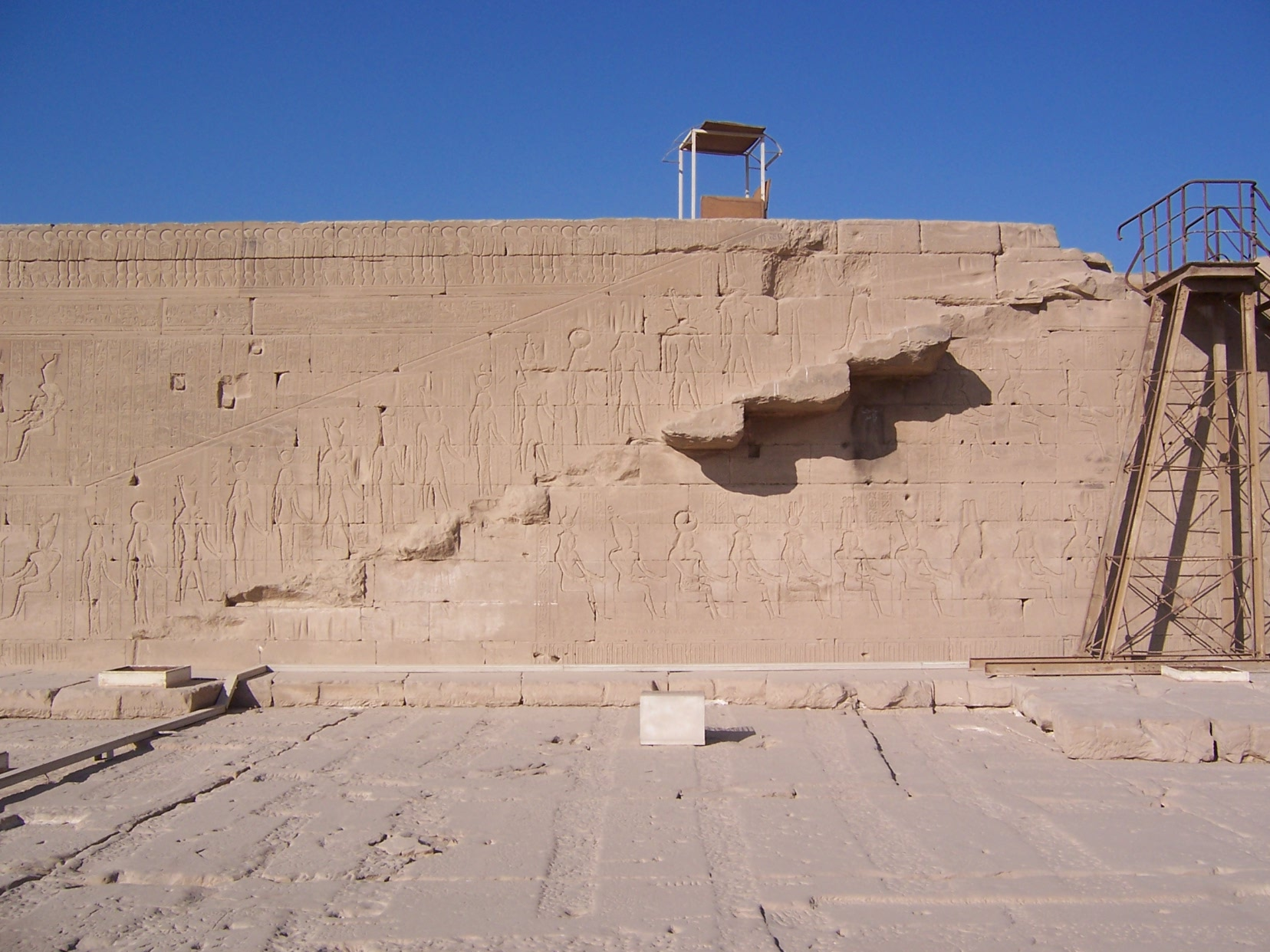
Outer wall of the pronaos.

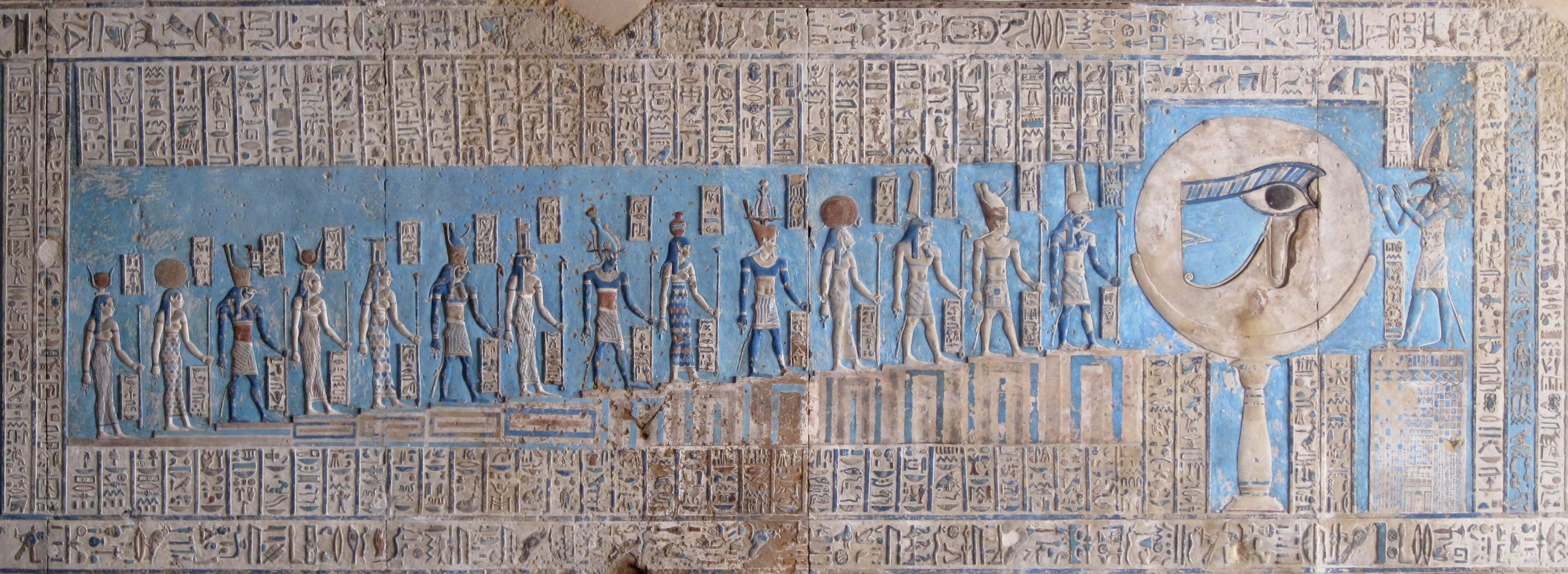
Painted relief from the ceiling of the pronaos.

==== Fourteen Osirian relics ====
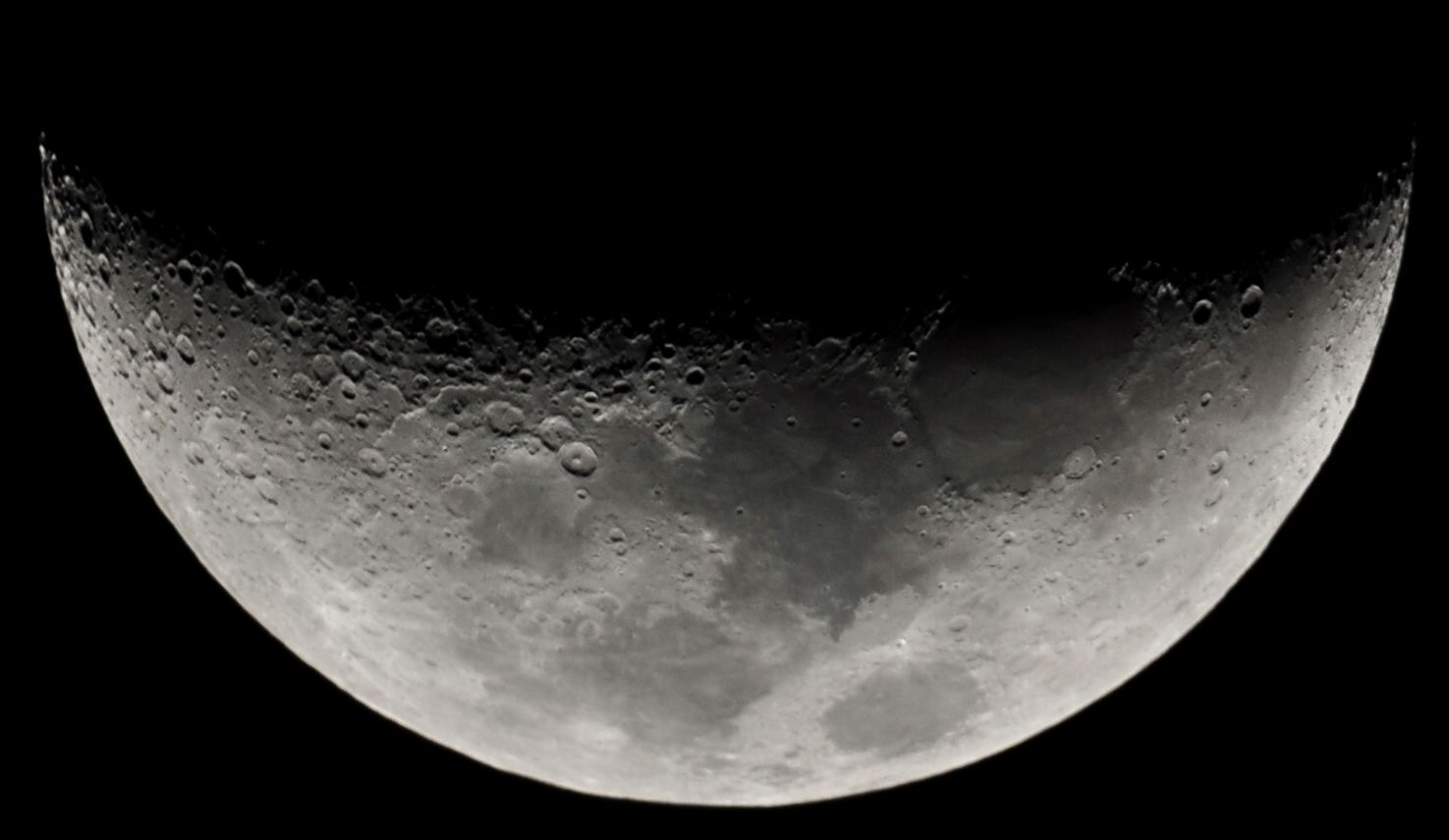
Crescent Moon on the seventh day.

The Egyptians left us several lists of the parts of the dismembered body of Osiris. The latter present numerous differences and inconsistencies between them, because each of them is the reflection of its own theological tradition. One of these schools of thought established a mystical equivalence between the reconstitution of the Moon in fourteen days (ascending phase) and the fourteen disjointed limbs of Osiris. In the story of the Greek Plutarch, the dismemberment of Osiris' body took place in a strong lunar context:

But Typhon [= Seth], one night when he was hunting by moonlight, found him, recognized the body, cut it into fourteen pieces and scattered them on all sides. — Plutarch, On Isis and Osiris, §18. Translation by Mario Meunier.

Further on (§8), Plutarch indicates that Seth found the body, by chance, while he was hunting a pig in the swamps of the delta. This assertion is consistent with an Egyptian source which says that the Eye of Horus, that is to say the Moon, was injured by Seth transformed into a black pig (chap. 112 of Book of the feet). Plutarch also reports other details regarding the assimilation of Osiris to the lunar cycle:

It is on the seventeenth day of the month of Athyr that Egyptian mythology places the death of Osiris. Now it is at this time when the full moon is particularly bright and complete. […] On the other hand, some say that Osiris lived, others that he reigned, for twenty-eight years. Now this number twenty-eight corresponds to the days during which we see the light of the moon, and to the time it takes to travel the circle of its revolution. […] The dismemberment of Osiris into fourteen pieces indicates, it is said, covertly, the number of days during which the moon decreases, from the full moon to the new moon. — Plutarch, On Isis and Osiris, §42. Translation by Mario Meunier.

==== Reconstruction of Osiris ====
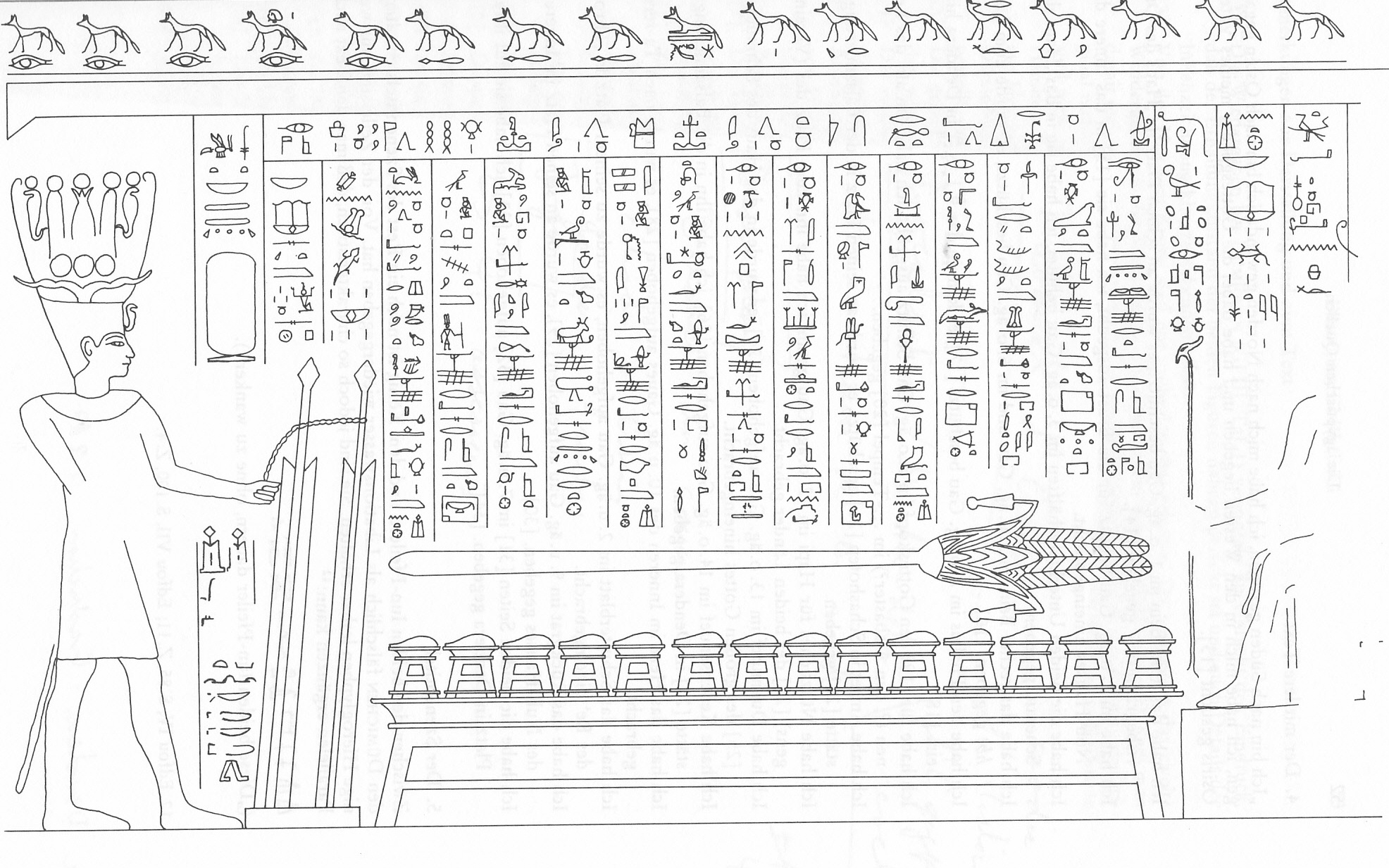
Relief showing Pharaoh offering the fourteen relics to Horus (Dendera temple).

During the month of Khoiak, the mystique of the number fourteen appears quite naturally during the implementation of rituals aimed at making small sacred effigies. The ingredients making up the sacred paste of the Sokar statuette are measured using fourteen containers called debeh . These small utensils, of various shapes, correspond to the fourteen disjointed limbs of Osiris. These containers are made of gold, silver or bronze depending on the importance given to the member they represent. The reunion of their contents in a single sacred vase symbolizes the rejoining of the body of Osiris, like Isis who had gathered together the shreds scattered by Set. Book V of the Ritual of the Mysteries of Dendera indicates that the fourteen utensils represent the head, the feet, the arm, the heart, the chest, the thigh, the eye, the fist, the finger, the phallus, the spine, the two ears, the nape of the neck and the two legs. Also at Dendera, a relief from the Osireion indicates that Pharaoh, as the prototype of the priest, is associated with the quest for the members and the reconstitution of Osiris through the elaboration of sacred effigies. The scene shows a table on which fourteen boxes containing a substitute relic are placed. The process of recomposition is symbolized by a reclining figure of the emblem of Nefertem which, in Memphis, always accompanies the procession of Sokar on the morning of Khoiak 26. The sovereign compares himself to Horus-sa-Aset, the son of Isis, responsible for leading the quest for his father's relics to the four corners of the country. After finding the members, the king indicates that he took them to Dendera in order to reconstruct the body in the chapels of Osiréion:

"I go south, I go north, I go east,

I'm heading west to search for my father's divine relics.

I protect the left leg in the nome ombite,

I install him in his place in the Sanctuary-where-Osiris-is-buried.

I protect the chest cavity in the Apollonopolite nome,

I bring her into the Golden Temple.

I protect the jaws in the latopolite nome,

I give it to the Sanctuaire-de-Chentayt.

I protect the right leg in the Lybic and Tentyrite nomes,

I give it to the Temple-of-mummification.

I protect the phallus in the diospolitan nome,

I bring him into the Osirian chapel in Iounet.

I defend the head of the god in the thinite nome,

I install it on the alabaster bedside in the Temple of Sokar.

I protect Amset in Chashotep,

I place him in his place in the sanctuary of the swaddle.

I take care of Hapi in the Antaeopolitan nome,

I take him to the burial place.

I carry Douamoutef in the upper lycopolitan nome,

I bring him into the sanctuary where the great god is prepared for burial.

I carry Kebehsenouf in the lower lycopolitan nome,

I install it in the mummification-workshop in Iounet

I carry the heart of the god in the Athribite Nome,

I bring it to Tarer.

I raise the scapula in the letopolite nome,

I take her into her place in the Place-de-Rê .

I carry the spine in the Busirite Nome,

I install him in his place in the Temple-of-Gold.

I extend my arms carrying the ribs in the metelite nome,

I make them rest in their place in Iounet.

— Sylvie Cauville, Dendara: The Osirian chapels, presentation by Pharaoh of the fourteen Osirian relics to Horus-son-of-Isis.

==== Regreening of Egypt ====
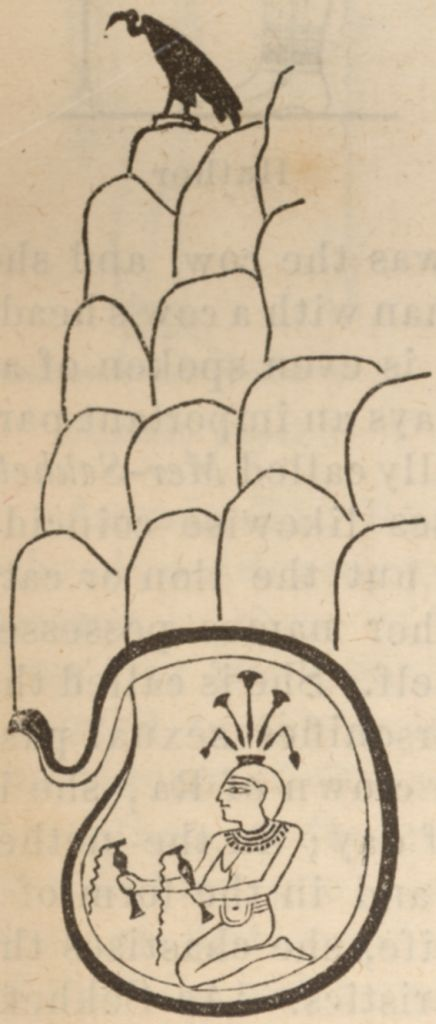
Hâpy hidden in his mysterious cave in Philæ

The symbolism of the number fourteen is found in Dendera in the third eastern chapel of Osireion where Harendotes, "Horus who protects his father", recites fourteen hymns on as many sacred boats. On the twenty-second Khoiak, the sacred figurines are now made. In each city, they are placed in their portable boat in preparation for the nautical procession which is to be held on the sacred lake of the temple. The different boats represent the main cities of the country, namely Memphis, Heliopolis, Thebes, Abydos, Busiris, Elkab, Bouto, Coptos, Dendera and Edfou. (Note: Thebes is mentioned twice, as are Busiris, Abydos and Denderah.) The fourteen hymns have as their central theme the multiple aspects of the personality of Osiris (Osiris moon, Osiris flood, Osiris king). Each verse begins with the formula “Stand up” in order to provoke the awakening of Osiris. (Note: This group of hymns is based on chapter 168 of the Book of the Dead, which was very popular in the Lower Period.) These hymns were perhaps recited by priests during the first phase of the lunar cycle (ascending period). The recovery of Osiris, that is to say his revivification, is encouraged by a series of words linking his rebirth, the flooding and the greening of the Nilotic banks; the agrarian renaissance being the main benefit of Osiris expected by the entire Egyptian people:

"THIRD BOAT: Barque of fusion.

Stand up in the boat of fusion,

melting into Sepa, led among the Souls of Heliopolis.

Stand up, you whose procession is great from Heliopolis to Kherâha,

who brings the flood, who floods the country for his ka[…]

Stand up in the cave,

melting into the escort of the flood to make the plants of the country grow.

Straighten up in your den, the places of worship rejoice for you when

you come as a flood measured with a measuring instrument

Straighten up in your time continually, in your time each day, being alive.

FOURTH BOAT (RELIQUARY): The reliquary- heken of the underground chapel in Busiris.

Stand up straight in your party pavilion,

the festive pavilion covered with reeds arranges your harpooneers against your enemies.

Stand up straight in your party pavilion,

the festive pavilion covered with flowers harassing the one who rebels against you in your place.

Stand up straight in your party pavilion,

you make the plants grow, you make the country green with the vine stocks.

Stand up straight in your party pavilion,

the papyrus pavilion, you make the sanctuaries of the gods your throne...

Stand up straight in your party pavilion,

rejuvenated in your time, you make plants, fresh plants and vegetables greener.

Stand up straight at your party,

the festival in Rothenflug which you come, you make all the flowers grow in your sight.

— Sylvie Cauville, Dendara: The Osirian chapels, Extracts from the fourteen hymns addressed by Harendotès to his father Osiris.

== Bibliography ==
=== General ===
- Assmann, Jan (2009). L'Égypte ancienne: entre mémoire et science. La chaire du Louvre. Paris: Hazan Musée du Louvre éd. ISBN 978-2-7541-0395-4.
- Assmann, Jan (2003). Mort et au-delà dans l'Égypte ancienne. Champollion. Monaco] [Paris: Éd. du Rocher. ISBN 978-2-268-04358-6.
- Assmann, Jan (2013). Religio duplex: comment les Lumières ont réinventé la religion des Égyptiens. Collection historique. Paris: Aubier. ISBN 978-2-7007-0427-3.
- Association les Amis de l'Égypte Ancienne (2000). "Osiris végétant". kemit.perso.neuf.fr. Archived from the original on 2009-12-14.
- Aufrère, Sydney H. (1993). "Le cosmos, le minéral, le végétal et le divin". Maison de l'Orient et de la Méditerranée.
- Aufrère, Sydney H. (1997). "L'Univers minéral dans la pensée égyptienne: essai de synthèse et perspectives". Archéo-Nil: 113–144.
- Aufrère, Sydney Hervé (1999). Encyclopédie religieuse de l'univers végétal: croyances phytoreligieuses de l'Égypte ancienne. Orientalia monspeliensia. Montpellier: Université Paul Valéry-Montpellier 3. ISBN 978-2-84269-310-7.
- Aufrère, Sydney Hervé (2007). Thot Hermès l'Égyptien: de l'infiniment grand à l'infiniment petit. Collection Kubaba. Paris Paris: Association Kubaba l'Harmattan. ISBN 978-2-296-04639-9.
- Aufrère, Sydney; Golvin, Jean-Claude; Goyon, Jean Claude (1991). L'Egypte restituée. Paris: Editions Errance. ISBN 978-2-87772-063-2.
- Betrò, Marilina (1995). Hiéroglyphes: les mystères de l'écriture. Paris: Flammarion. ISBN 978-2-08-012465-4.
- Blavatsky, Helena Petrovna (2013) [1877]. Isis dévoilée: clef des mystères de la science et de la théologie anciennes et modernes. Hachette Livre BNF. ISBN 978-2012849280.
- Borghouts, Joris F., ed. (1978). Ancient Egyptian magical texts. Nisaba. Leiden: Brill. ISBN 978-90-04-05848-4.
- Bricault, Laurent, ed. (2013). Les cultes isiaques dans le monde gréco-romain. La roue à livres/Documents. Paris: Les Belles Lettres. ISBN 978-2-251-33969-6. OCLC 840466501.
- Cauville, Sylvie (2011). L'offrande aux dieux dans le temple égyptien. Leuven; Walpole, MA: Peeters. ISBN 978-90-429-2568-7.
- Corteggiani, Jean Pierre (2007). L'Égypte ancienne et ses dieux: dictionnaire illustré. Paris: Fayard. ISBN 978-2-213-62739-7.
- Coulon, Laurent; Leclère, François; Marchand, Sylvie (1995). ""Catacombes" osiriennes de Ptolémée IV à Karnak. Rapport préliminaire de la campagne de fouilles 1993". Cahiers de Karnak. 10: 205–251. doi:10.34847/NKL.E40EOR82.
- Dachez, Roger (2012). Les rites maçonniques égyptiens. Que sais-je ?. Paris: Presses universitaires de France. ISBN 978-2-13-058198-7.
- Derchain, Philippe (1962). "Le Papyrus Salt 825, rituel pour la conservation de la vie". Palais des Académies.
- Frazer, James George (1998). Le rameau d'or. Bouquins. Paris: R. Laffont. ISBN 978-2-221-08847-0.
- Gemeinde, Elvira (2012). Les francs-maçons enfants de la veuve et les mystères d'Isis. Les symboles maçonniques. Paris: MdV éd. ISBN 978-2-35599-111-0.
- Gomez, Jean Charles Coovi (2012). "Teaser université virtuelle des savoirs". Afropolis-Youtube.
- Goyon, Jean Claude (2007). "Deux pionniers lyonnais de la Paléoécologie de la Vallée du Nil égyptien : Victor Loret (1859-1946) et Louis Lortet (1836-1909). La constitution de la collection égyptienne du Muséum d'Histoire Naturelle de Lyon". museedesconfluences.fr. Archived from the original on 2008-11-24.
- Herbin, François-René (1988). "Les premières pages du papyrus Salt 825 », BIFAO, vol. 88, p. 95-112". www.ifao.egnet.net.
- Koemoth, Pierre (2006). "Service d'Égyptologie - P. Koemoth". www.egypto.ulg.ac.be.
- Lalouette, Claire (1995). Contes et récits de l'Egypte ancienne. Paris: Flammarion. ISBN 978-2-08-210270-4.
- Leclère, François (2005). Le quartier de l'Osireion de Karnak. Analyse du contexte topographique.
- Loret, Victor (1951). "Le mille-pattes et la chaise à porteurs de pharaon". Revue d'Égyptologie. 6: 5–20.
- Masquelier-Loorius, Julie (2013). Séthi Ier et le début de la XIXe dynastie. Les grands pharaons. Paris: Pygmalion. ISBN 978-2-7564-0058-7.
- Montoumès (2009). "Osiris végétant". Dictionnaire encyclopédique de l'Égypte antique.
- Ordre de la Rose-Croix (1998). "Histoire du Rosicrucianisme". Ordre de la Rose-Croix. Archived from the original on 21 April 2024.
- Roeder, Günther (1952). Zwei hieroglyphische Inschriften aus Hermopolis (Ober-Ägypten) (52 ed.). Annales du service des antiquités de l'Égypte (ASAÉ).
- Rothenflug, Robert (2013). "Osiris Gisant". www.lesphotosderobert.com.
- Salmon, William (1754). "Esprit Gobineau de Montluisant, Énigmes et Hiéroglyphes". Bibliothèque des Philosophes chimiques – via Paris, A.Cailleau.
- Servajean, Frédéric (1999). "Enquête sur la palmeraie de Bouto (I): Les lymphes d'Osiris et la résurrection végétale". Univers végétal.
- Servajean, Frédéric (2009). "Le cycle du ba dans le Rituel de l'Embaumement". ENiM: 9–23.
- UCLA (2008). "Digital Karnak: Feature - Osiris Catacombs". wayback.archive-it.org. Archived from the original on 2009-04-26.
- Université de Barcelone (2010). "Oxyrhynchus". Archived from the original on 2014-05-06.

=== Khoiak rituals ===
- Barguet, Paul (1962). Le papyrus N. 3176 (S) du musée du Louvre. Le Caire, IFAO.
- Cauville, Sylvie (1988). "Les mystères d'Osiris à Dendera: Interprétation des chapelles osiriennes". BSFE, Paris, Société française d'égyptologie. 112: 23–36.
- Cauville, Sylvie (1997). Le temple de Dendara: les chapelles osiriennes. Le Caire Paris: Institut français d'archéologie orientale diff. Impr. nationale. ISBN 978-2-7247-0199-9.
- Chassinat, Émile (1966). Le mystère d'Osiris au mois de Khoiak. Le Caire, IFAO.
- Chassinat, Émile (1968). Le mystère d'Osiris au mois de Khoiak. Le Caire, IFAO.
- Colin, Frédéric (2003). "Le parfumeur (pa ant), Document 3. Les rites funéraires d'Osiris sur le toit de Philæ, au ive siècle de notre ère". BIFAO, le Caire, IFAO. 103.
- Derchain, Philippe (1964). "Le papyrus Salt 825 (British Museum 10051): rituel pour la conservation de la vie en Égypte". Palais des Académies, Bruxelles.
- Eaton, Katherine J. (2006). "The Festivals of Osiris and Sokar in the Month of Khoiak: The Evidence from Nineteenth Dynasty Royal Monuments at Abydos". Studien zur Altägyptischen Kultur, Helmut Buske Verlag. 35.
- Gaballa, G. A.; Kitchen, K. A. (1969). "The festival of Sokar". Faculty of Ancient Oriental Studies, Pontifical Biblical Institute.
- Goyon, Jean-Claude (1967). Le cérémonial de glorification d'Osiris du papyrus du Louvre I. 3079 (colonnes 110 à 112). Vol. 65. BIFAO, Le Caire.
- Goyon, Jean-Claude (1978). "La fête de Sokaris à Edfou. À la lumière d'un texte liturgique remontant au Nouvel Empire". BIFAO, le Caire. 78.
- Loret, Victor (1882). "Les fêtes d'Osiris au mois de Khoiak". Recueil de travaux relatifs à la philologie et à l'archéologie égyptiennes et assyriennes. Paris: IFAO: 43–57.
- Yoyotte, Jean (1977). "Religion de l'Egypte ancienne. I. La cuve osirienne de Coptos". AEPHE. 86.

=== Osiris ===
- Assmann, Jan (2000). "Re-Membering Osiris: From the Death cult to Cultural Memory". ReMembering the Body, Hatje Cantz (122): 44–78. doi:10.4000/bifao.12872.
- Beinlich, Horst (1984). Die "Osirisreliquien": zum Motiv der Körperzergliederung in der altägyptischen Religion. Ägyptologische Abhandlungen. Wiesbaden: Harrassowitz. ISBN 978-3-447-02498-3.
- Claus, Benoit (2005). "Osiris et Hapi: crue et régénération en Égypte ancienne". In Amenta, Alessia (ed.). L' acqua nell'Antico Egitto: vita, rigenerazione, incantesimo, medicamento; proceedings of the First International conference for Young Egyptologists, Italy, Chainciano Terme, October 15 - 18, 2003. Egitto antico Atti. Roma: L'Erma di Bretschneider. ISBN 978-88-8265-307-1.
- Coulon, Laurent (2005). "Les reliques d'Osiris en Egypte ancienne: données générales et particularismes thébains". Berne.
- Coulon, Laurent (2008). "Le tombeau d'Osiris à travers les textes magiques du Nouvel Empire". BiEtud 145: Mélanges offerts à François Neveu, le Caire.
- Coulon, Laurent (2010). "Le culte d'Osiris au Ier millénaire av. J.-C.: découvertes et travaux récents, Actes de la table ronde internationale tenue à Lyon, Maison de l'Orient et de la Méditerranée". Université Lumière-Lyon 2.
- Coulon, Laurent (2013). "Osiris chez Hérodote". Maison de l'Orient et de la Méditerranée.
- Graindorge-Héreil, Catherine (1994). Le Dieu Sokar à Thèbes au Nouvel Empire - Tome 2: Planches. Göttinger Orientforschungen GOF. Reihe 4, Ägypten. Wiesbaden: Harrassowitz. ISBN 978-3-447-03476-0.
- Kettel, Jeannot (1994). "Canopes, rḏw.w d'Osiris et Osiris-Canope". In Leclant, Jean; Berger, Catherine; Clerc, Gisèle; Grimal, Nicolas-Christophe (eds.). Hommages à Jean Leclant. Bibliothéque d'étude (in French, English, German, and Italian). Le Caire: Institut français d'archéologie orientale. ISBN 978-2-7247-0134-0.
- Koemoth, Pierre (1994). Osiris et les arbres: Contribution à l'étude des arbres sacrés de l'Égypte ancienne.
- Lavier, Marie-Christine (1998). "Les fêtes d'Osiris à Abydos au Moyen Empire et au Nouvel Empire". Égypte, Afrique et Orient, Avignon. 10.
- Lippert, Sandra L. (2012). "L'étiologie de la fabrication des statuettes osiriennes au mois de Khoiak et le Rituel de l'ouverture de la bouche d'après le papyrus Jumilhac". ENIM 5, Montpellier.
- Pantalacci, Laure (1981). Recherches sur Osiris démembré. Université Paris IV.

=== Translations ===
- Barguet, Paul, ed. (1967). Le livre des morts des anciens Egyptiens. Littératures anciennes du Proche-Orient. Paris: Éds. du CERF. ISBN 978-2-204-01354-3.
- Barguet, Paul, ed. (1986). Les Textes des sarcophages égyptiens du Moyen Empire. Littératures anciennes du Proche-Orient. Paris: Cerf. ISBN 978-2-204-02332-0.
- De Sicile, Diodore (1851). Bibliothèque historique. Translated by Hoefer, Ferd. Paris, Adolphe Delahays Libraire.
- Fermat, André (2010). Le rituel de la maison de vie: Papyrus Salt 825. Collection Égypte ancienne. Paris: MdV éd. ISBN 978-2-35599-052-6.
- Herbin, François-René (1982). "Hymne à la lune croissante". BIFAO. 82.
- Lalouette, Claire, ed. (1994). Textes sacrés et textes profanes de l'ancienne Egypte. Collection UNESCO d'œuvres représentatives. Paris: Gallimard. ISBN 978-2-07-071176-5.
- Plutarque (1979). Isis et Osiris [Isis et Osiris]. Translated by Meunier, Mario (Fac-sim. ed.). Paris: Éditions de la Maisnie. ISBN 978-2-85707-045-0.
- Vandier, Jacques (1961). "Le Papyrus Jumilhac". CNRS.
- Vernus, Pascal, ed. (1992). Chants d'amour de l'Egypte antique. La Salamandre. Paris: Impr. nationale éditions. ISBN 978-2-11-081147-9.
