= Miniature shrine =

A miniature shrine, also referred to in literature as a portable shrine, pocket shrine, or a travel altar, is a small, generally moveable shrine or altar. They vary greatly in size and architectural style, and by which region or culture produced them.

== History ==
=== Antiquity ===
==== Egypt ====
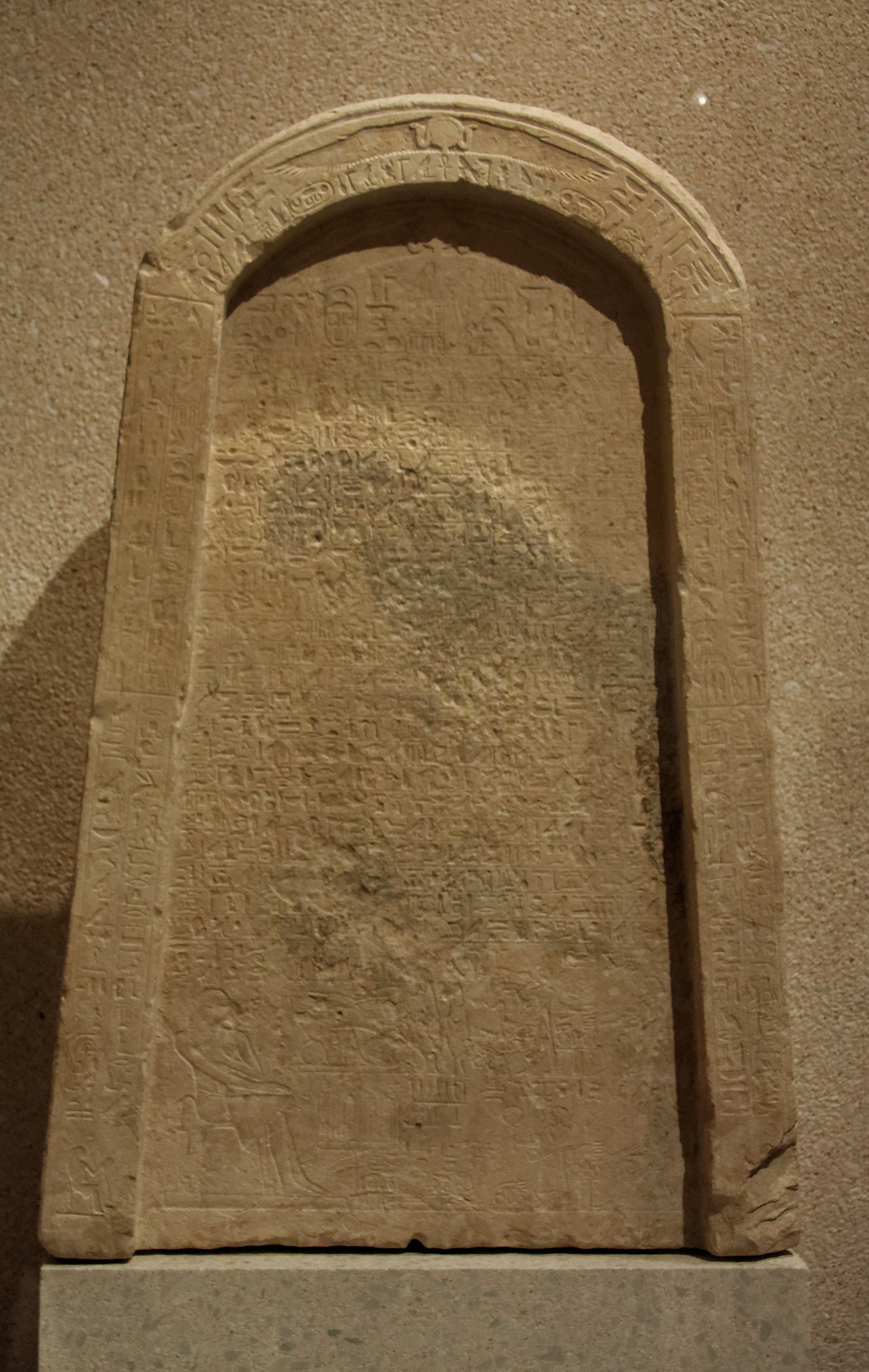
The Ikhernofret stela, housed in the Egyptian Museum of Berlin

The Ikhernofret Stela, dated to the Middle Kingdom of Egypt, is the earliest extant literary reference to a portable shrine. The stela is 100 cm high and made of limestone. Osiris is depicted standing under a winged sun disk facing Senwosret III. The text is laid out below Osiris in twenty-four horizontal lines. Underneath the text, Ikhernofret, a 12th dynasty treasurer under Pharaoh Senwosret III, is depicted at an offering table with his family. It reads:

I acted as Son, Whom He Loves, for Osiris, First of the Westerners, I adorned the great [...] forever and ever. I made for him a portable shrine, the Bearer-of-Beauty of the First-of-the- Westerners, of gold, silver, lazuli, fragrant woods, carob wood, and meru wood, fashioned the gods belonging to his divine ennead, made their shrines anew.

The New Kingdom Gurob Shrine Papyrus is a fragment of a workman's designs for a portable altar. It dates perhaps to the 18th Dynasty.

One of the best-known artifacts of Ancient Egypt is the Anubis Shrine, which is in a portable form, placed atop a palanquin. The statue of a recumbent jackal is attached to the roof of the shrine. The statue is made from wood, covered with black paint. The insides of the ears, the eyebrows, and the rims of the eyes, and the collar and the band knotted around the neck, are worked in gold leaf.

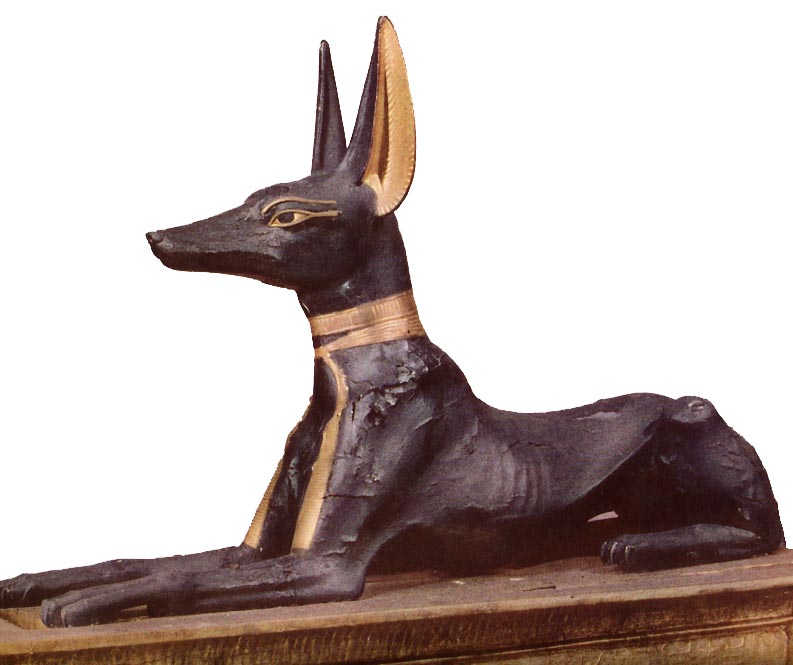
Detail of the statue (presumably of Anubis) placed on top of the shrine.

==== Greece ====
In Greece, roadside shrines, often referred to as "kandilakia" (Greek: Kαντηλάκια) or εικονοστάσιο στην άκρη του δρόμου (ikonostásio stin akri tu drómu, literally "Shrine at the roadside") are seen throughout the country.

They are commonly built in the memory of a fatal accidents and usually include a photograph of the victim(s), their namesake/patron Saint and sometimes personal items. They may also be built from car accident survivors thanking the Saint who protected them.

==== Rome ====
By the early Imperial period, household shrines were known generically as lararia (plural lararium) because they typically housed a figure of a Lares, guardian deities in ancient Roman religion. Painted lararia from Pompeii show two Lares flanking a genius or ancestor-figure, who wears his toga in the priestly manner prescribed for sacrificers. Underneath this trio, a serpent, representing the fertility of fields or the principle of generative power, winds towards an altar. The essentials of sacrifice are depicted around and about; bowl and knife, incense box, libation vessels and parts of sacrificial animals. In households of modest means, small Lar statuettes were set in wall-niches, sometimes merely a tile-support projecting from a painted background. In wealthier households, they tend to be found in servant's quarters and working areas.

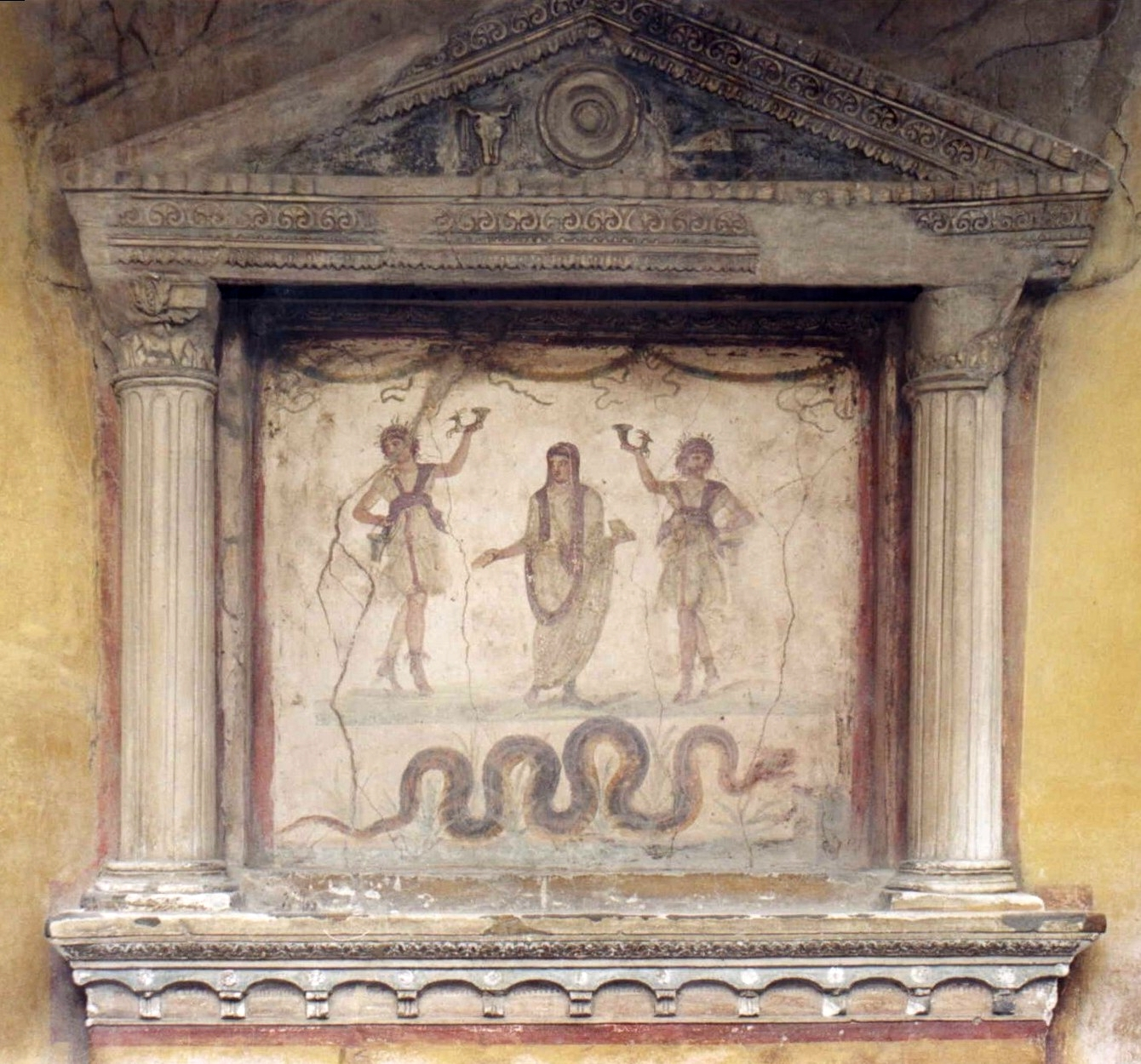
Lararium at the House of the Vettii: Two Lares, each holding a rhyton, flank an ancestor-genius holding a libation bowl and incense box, his head covered as if for sacrifice. The snake, associated with the land's fertility and thus prosperity, approaches a low, laden altar. The shrine's tympanum shows a patera, ox-skull and sacrificial knife.

The placing of Lares in the public or semi-public parts of a house, such as its atrium, enrolled them in the more outward, theatrical functions of household religion.

=== Medieval ===
==== Asia ====
In Buddhism, portable shrines were made so that devout travelers with nowhere to worship could carry their shrines with them. The shrines were two-piece, and could be shut together to preserve the artwork. Miniature buddhas and goddesses could be carried in small lacquer cases carried on the wrist.

In Tibet, shrines called gau are worn as jewelry.

The mikoshi is a Japanese type of portable shrine used mostly during Shinto religious festivals called matsuri.

==== Christian Europe ====
The Monymusk Reliquary is an eighth-century Scottish reliquary made of wood and metal characterized by an Insular fusion of Gaelic and Pictish design and Anglo-Saxon metalworking, probably by Ionan monks. It is now in the National Museum of Scotland in Edinburgh. It is characterised by a mixture of Pictish artistic designs and Irish artistic traditions (perhaps first brought to Scotland by Irish missionaries in the sixth century), fused with Anglo-Saxon metalworking techniques, an artistic movement now classified as Insular or Hiberno-Saxon art. The casket is wooden, but is covered with silver and copper-alloy.

A particularly well-preserved portable shrine, the Shrine of the Three Kings in the Cologne Cathedral, is archetypal of the Romanesque style of reliquaries. The shrine is about 43 inches (110 cm) wide, 60 inches (153 cm) high, and 87 inches (220 cm) long. It is modeled after a basilica. Two sarcophagi stand next to each other, with the third sarcophagus resting on their roof ridges.

The great gilt-copper and enamel Reliquary Shrine of Saint Eleutherius in the cathedral of Tournai (Belgium), one of the masterpieces of Gothic metalwork, was commissioned by Bishop Walter de Marvis of Tournai, and completed in 1247, on the occasion of the retranslation of relics of Saint Eleutherius of Tournai, traditionally the city's first bishop. The shrine takes the architectural form of a chasse or gabled casket.

=== Modern period ===
==== Colonial period ====
Nichos originated as a popular adaptation of the Roman Catholic retablo tradition of painting patron saints on wood or tin. Unlike the large, flat panels of retablo, nichos are small and built in shadow box style. Common structural conventions include hinged doors, carved borders, and multiple panels. Within the box there is a key object or central figure for whose honor or memory the nicho has been created. Nichos are usually painted with striking colors, often contrasting bright and dark, and tend towards garish. In addition to painted designs, nichos are decorated with all variety of images and objects from religious and popular culture.

==== World War I ====
During World War I, extremely small shrines (generally referred to as pocket shrines) became incredibly popular amongst soldiers, especially in France.

== Contemporary developments ==
Some contemporary artists, particularly in Asia where domestic altars remain a cultural and spiritual staple, have acted as inspiration for a number of works.

=== Design ===
The Japanese design firm moconoco released a kamidana (literally "god shelf") modeled after the iPhone in order to "seamlessly incorporate [the altar] into modern environments." The front is etched with an image of the Ise Grand Shrine.

=== Fine art ===
In 2007, several contemporary Maya artists collaborated and released an artist's book in the form of a portable Maya shrine. Along with 12 candles and small effigies of animals, they contain three books entitled Hex to Kill the Unfaithful Man, Mayan Love Charms, and Magic for a Long Life.

The Korean artist Yeesookyung exhibited his piece Portable Temple, based on traditional East Asian folding screens, at the Mongin Art Center, South Korea in 2008.

== Gallery ==
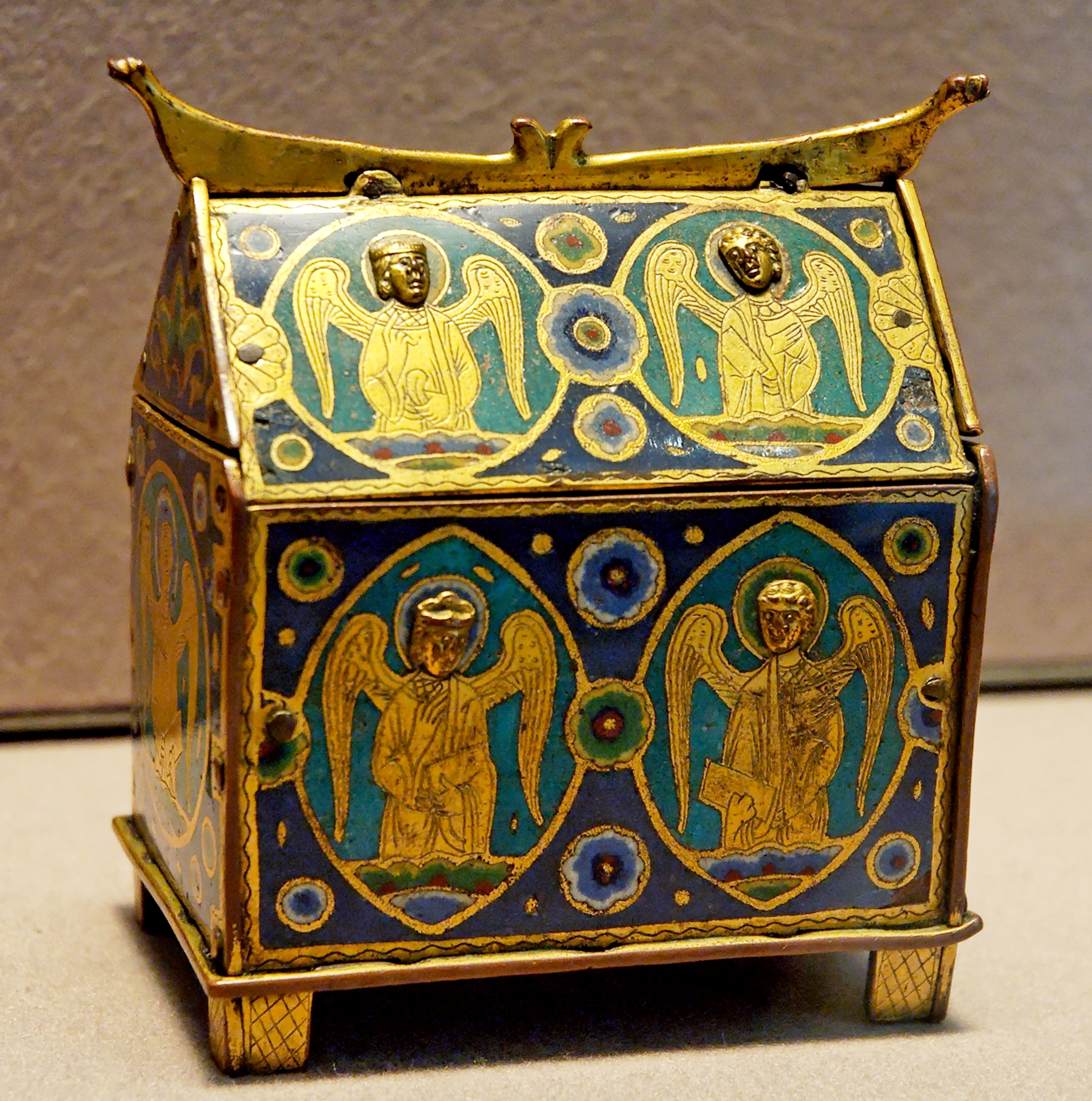
Early 13th-century chasse used to hold holy oils

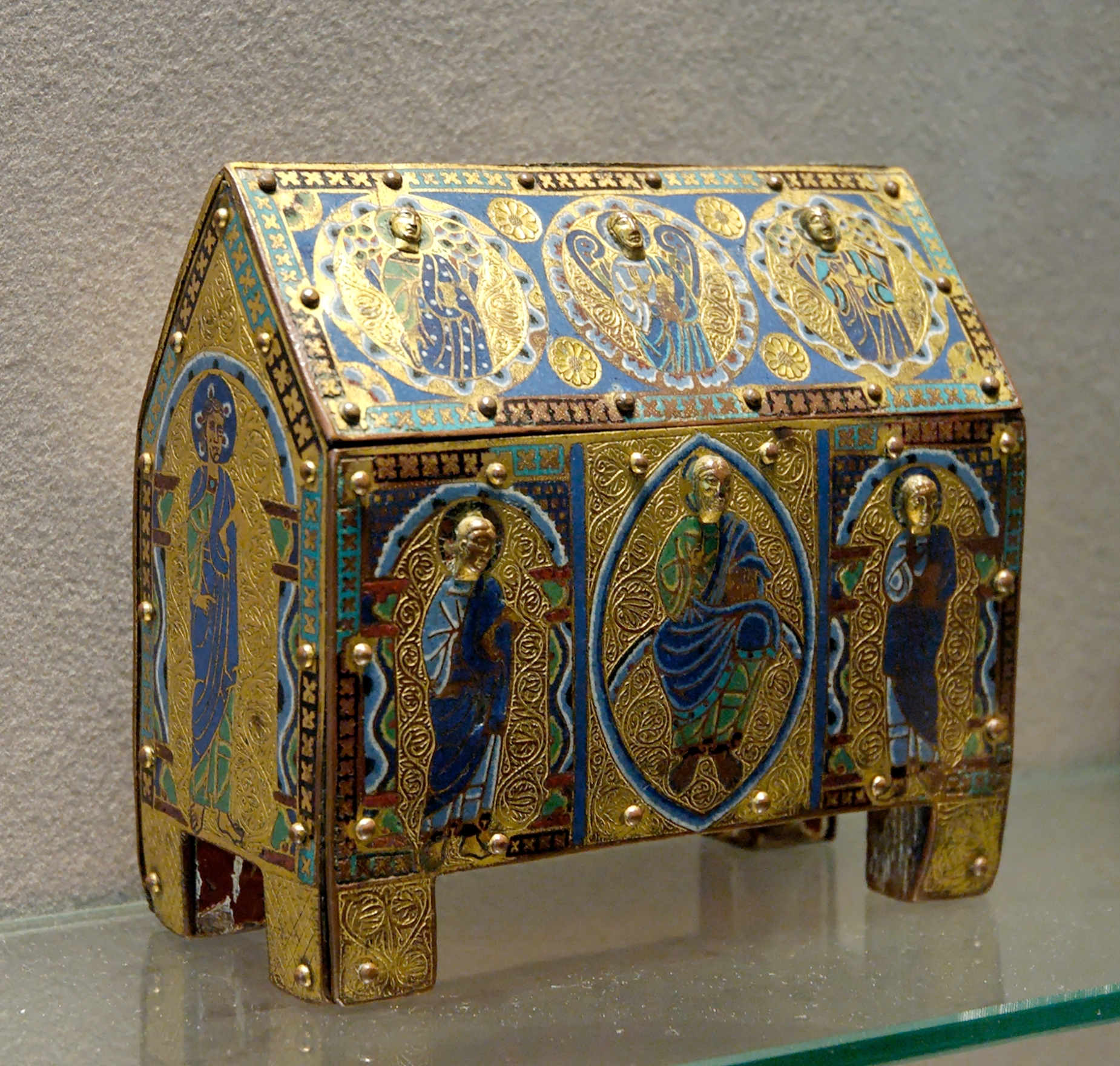
Example with vermiculated gilded background, and enamelled figures.

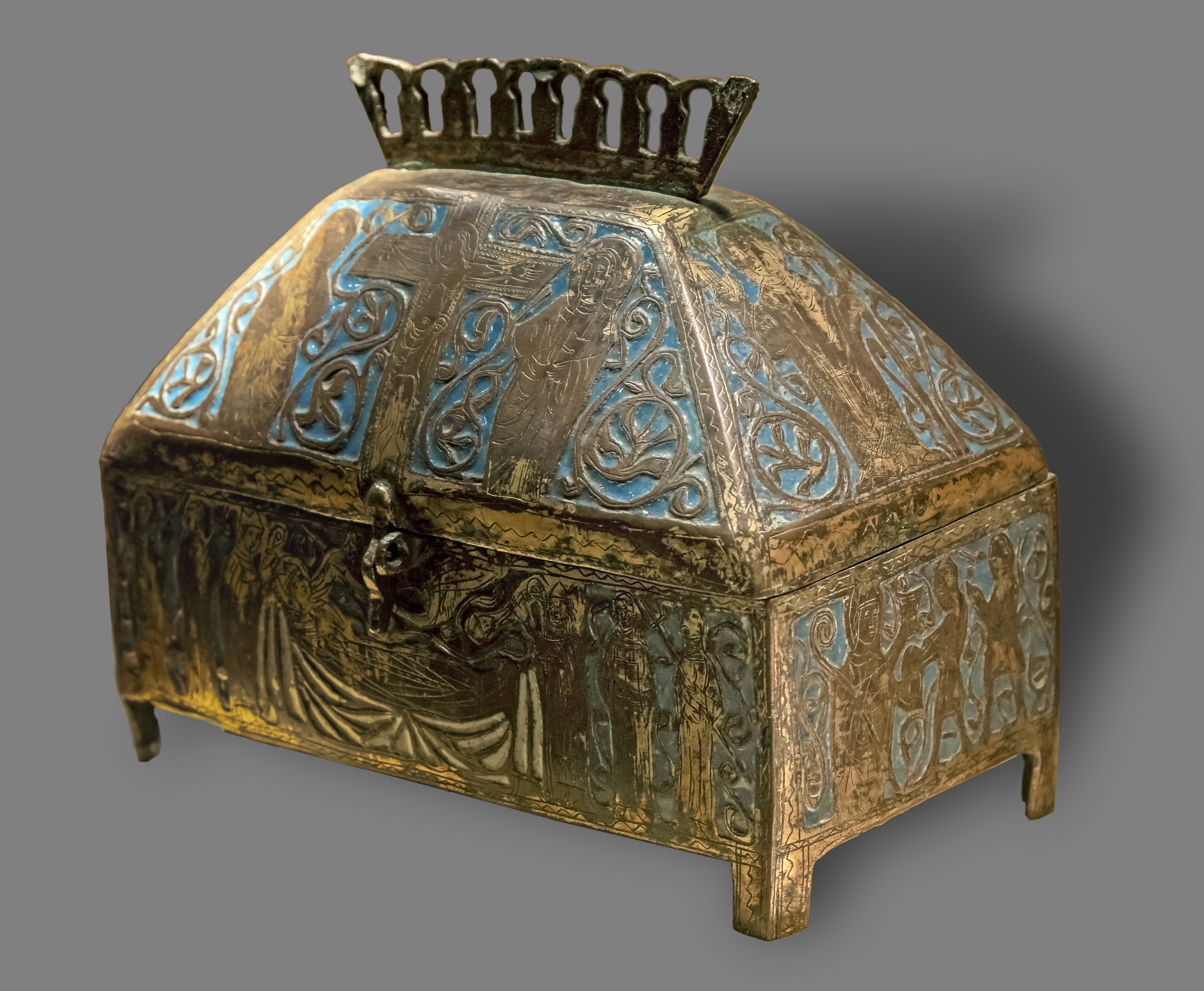
13th-century Chasse of Saint Exupère

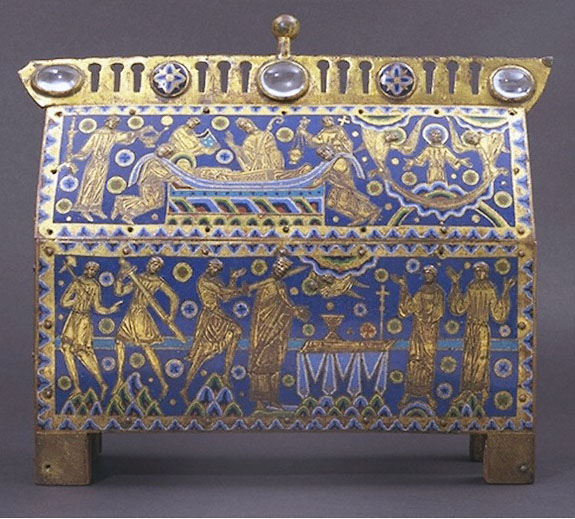
The Becket Casket, c. 1180–1190, Limoges, with the popular subject of the martyrdom of Thomas Becket.

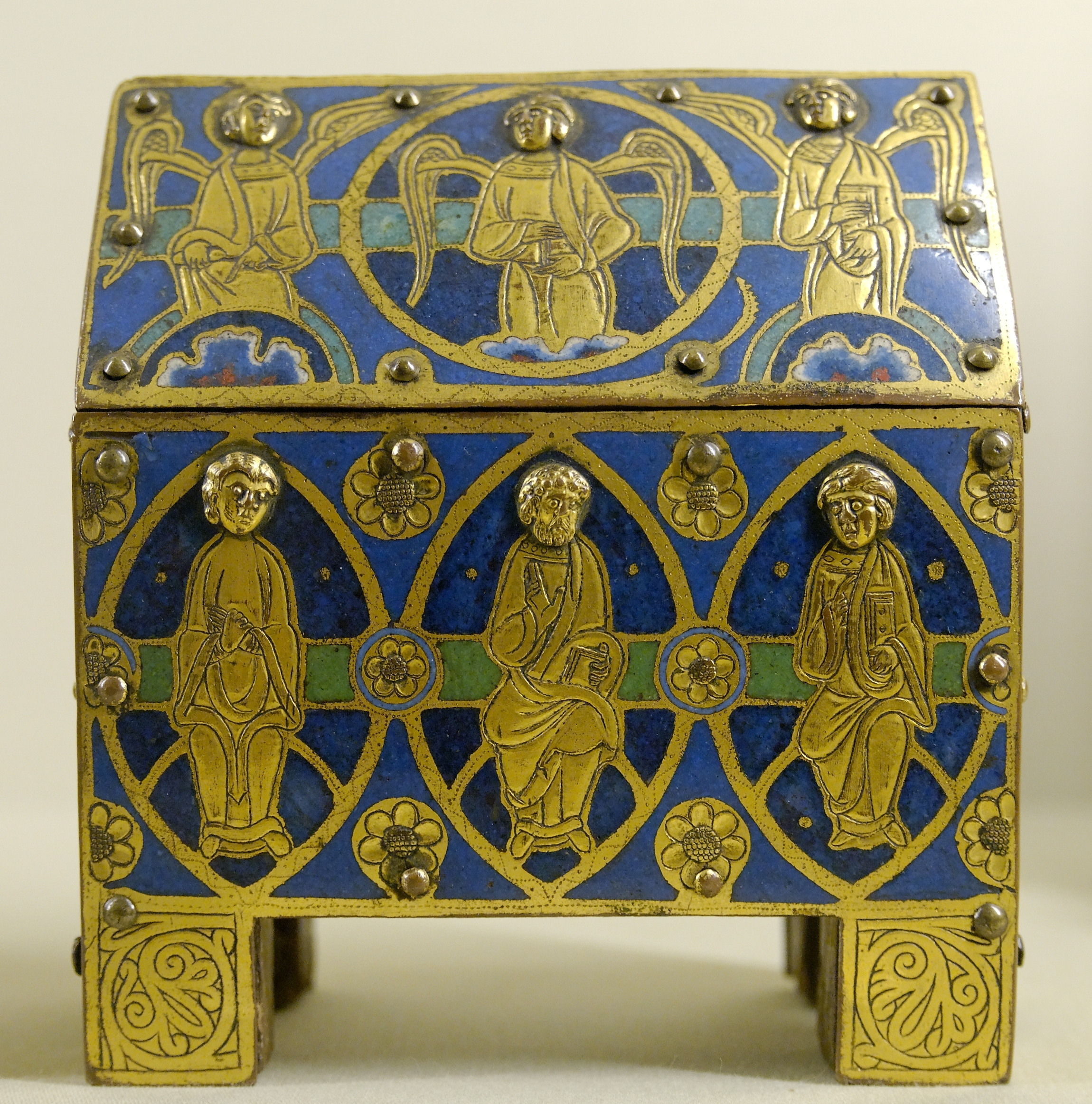
Limoges, with apostles and angels

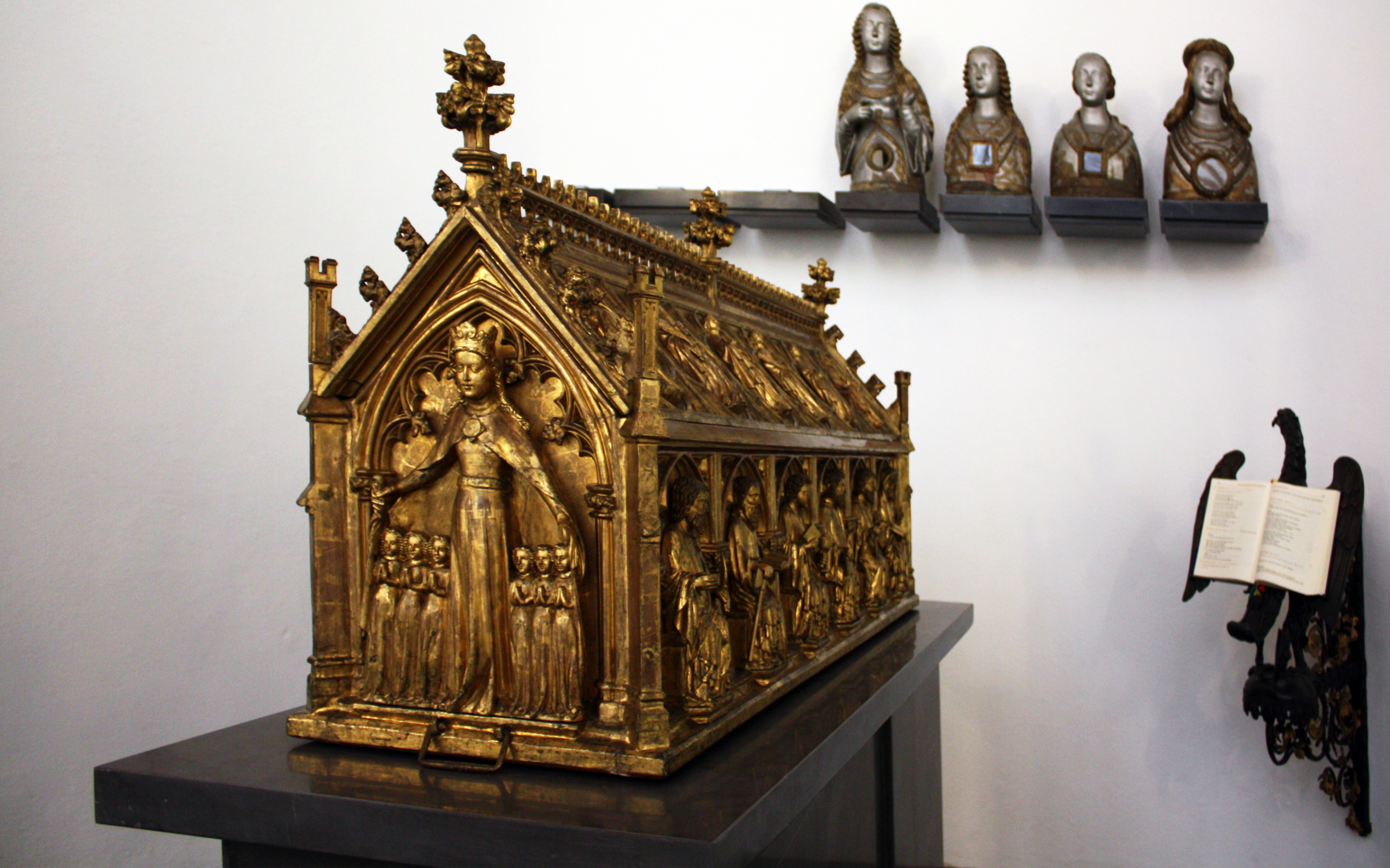
Gothic goldsmith's chasse, Cologne

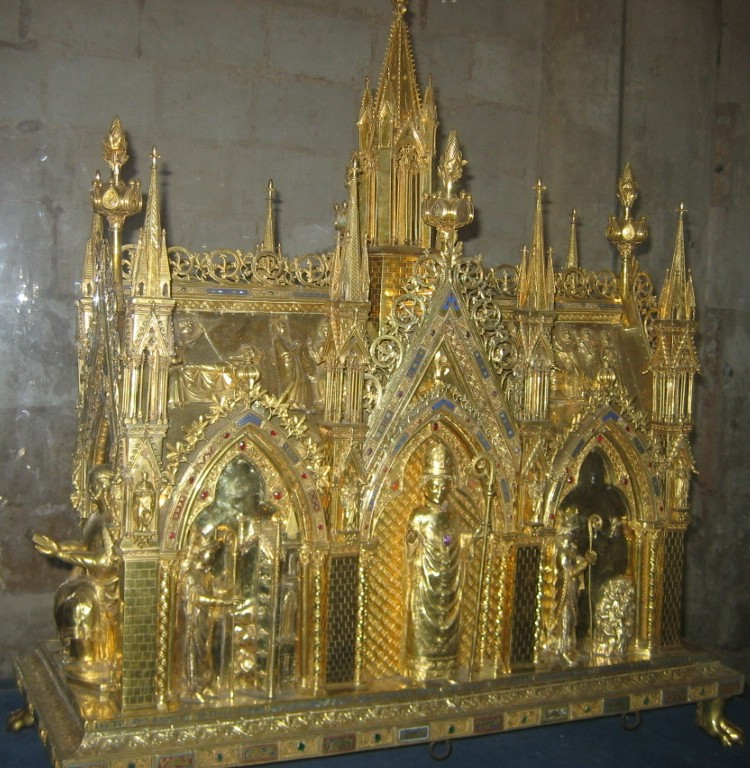
Very elaborate French 13th-century chasse reliquary of Saint Taurin, Évreux (Eure)

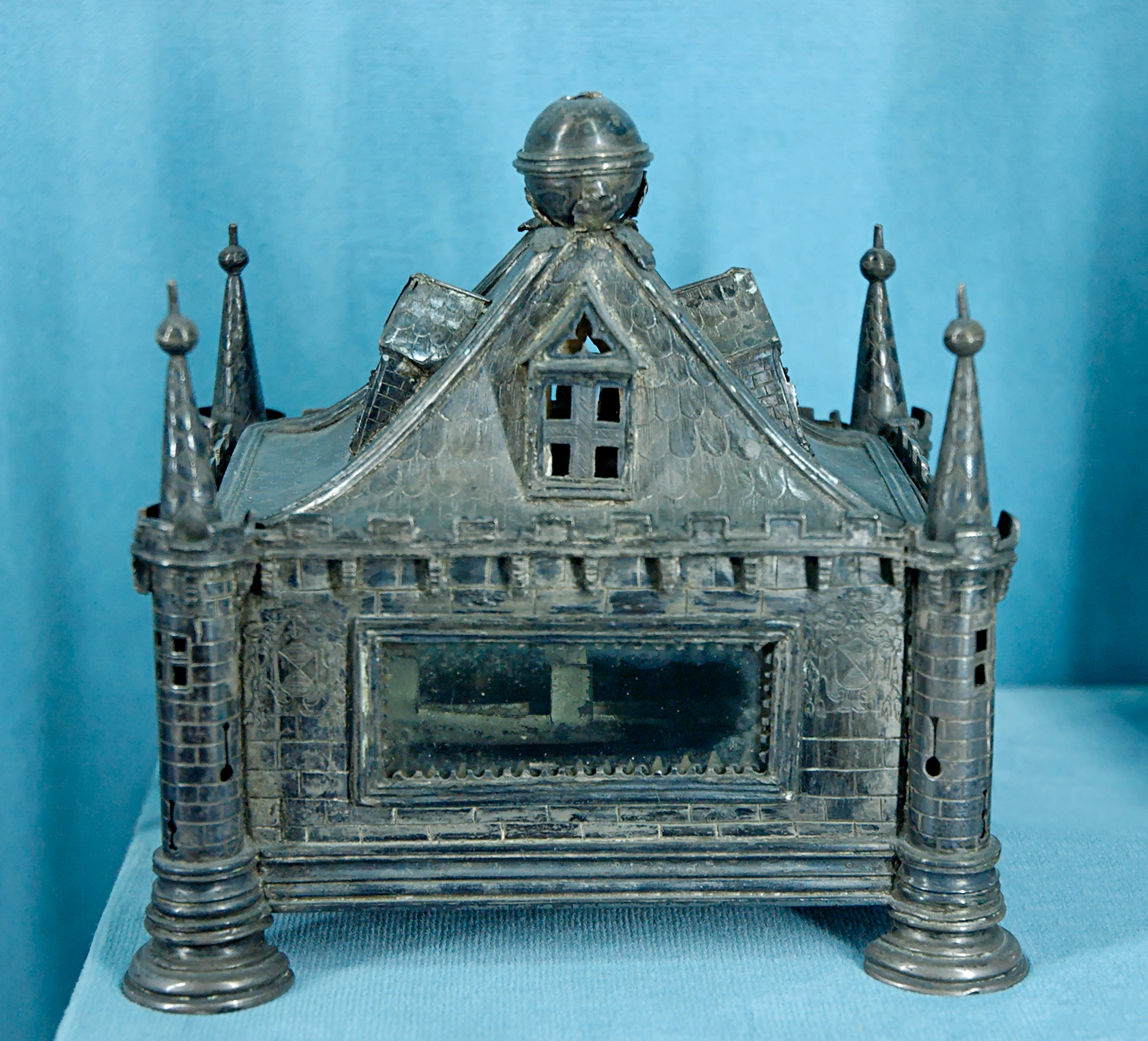
Later French reliquary; certainly a house, but perhaps not a chasse

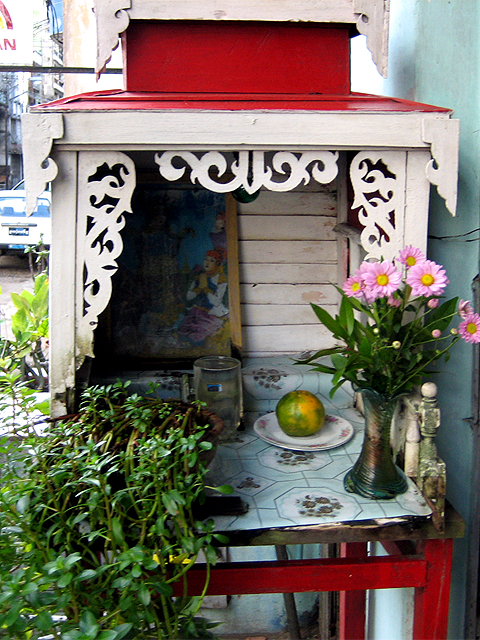
A nat sin in Yangon, Burma

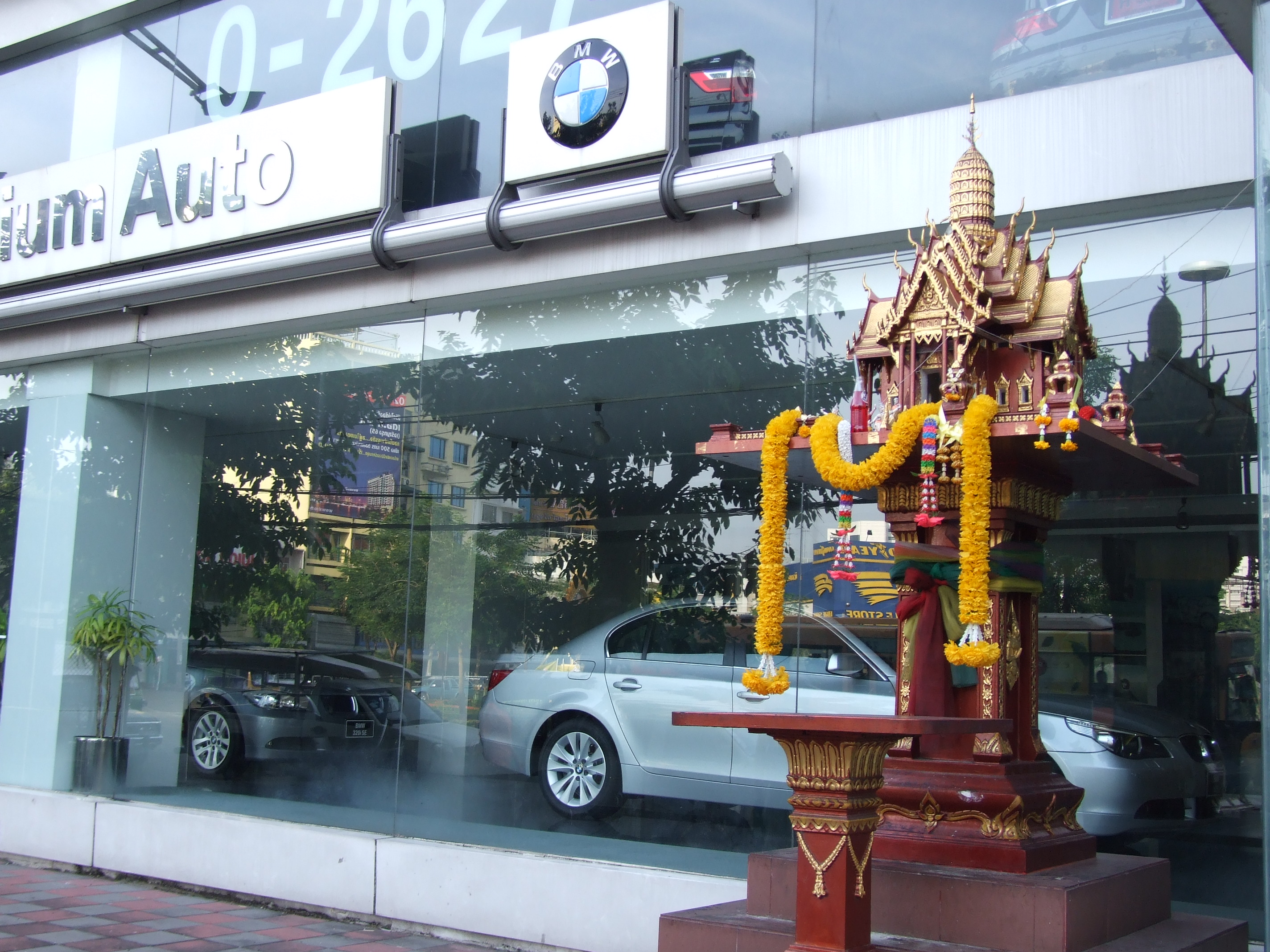
Spirit house, Bangkok

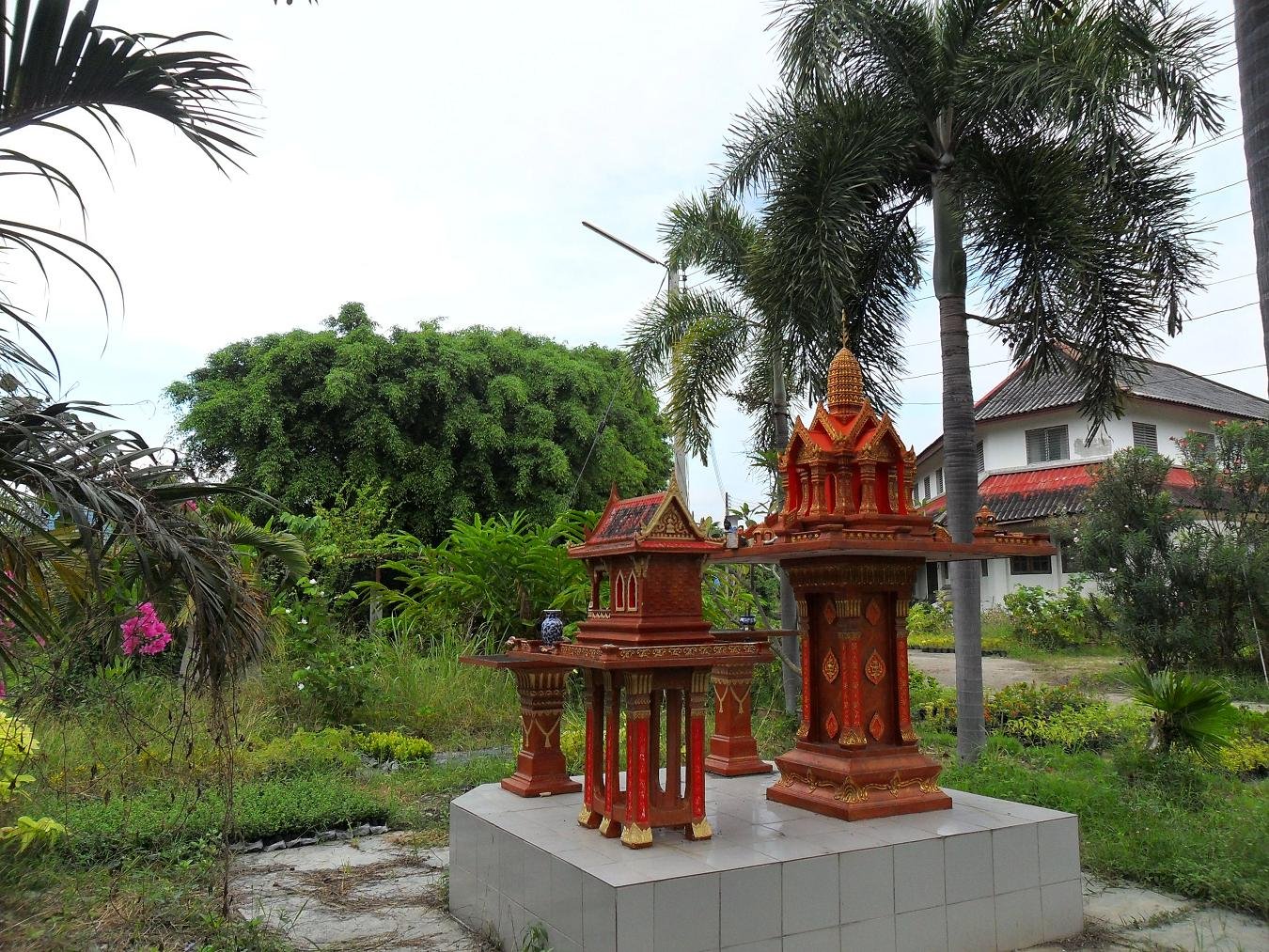
Spirit houses at a private house, Phetchaburi, Thailand

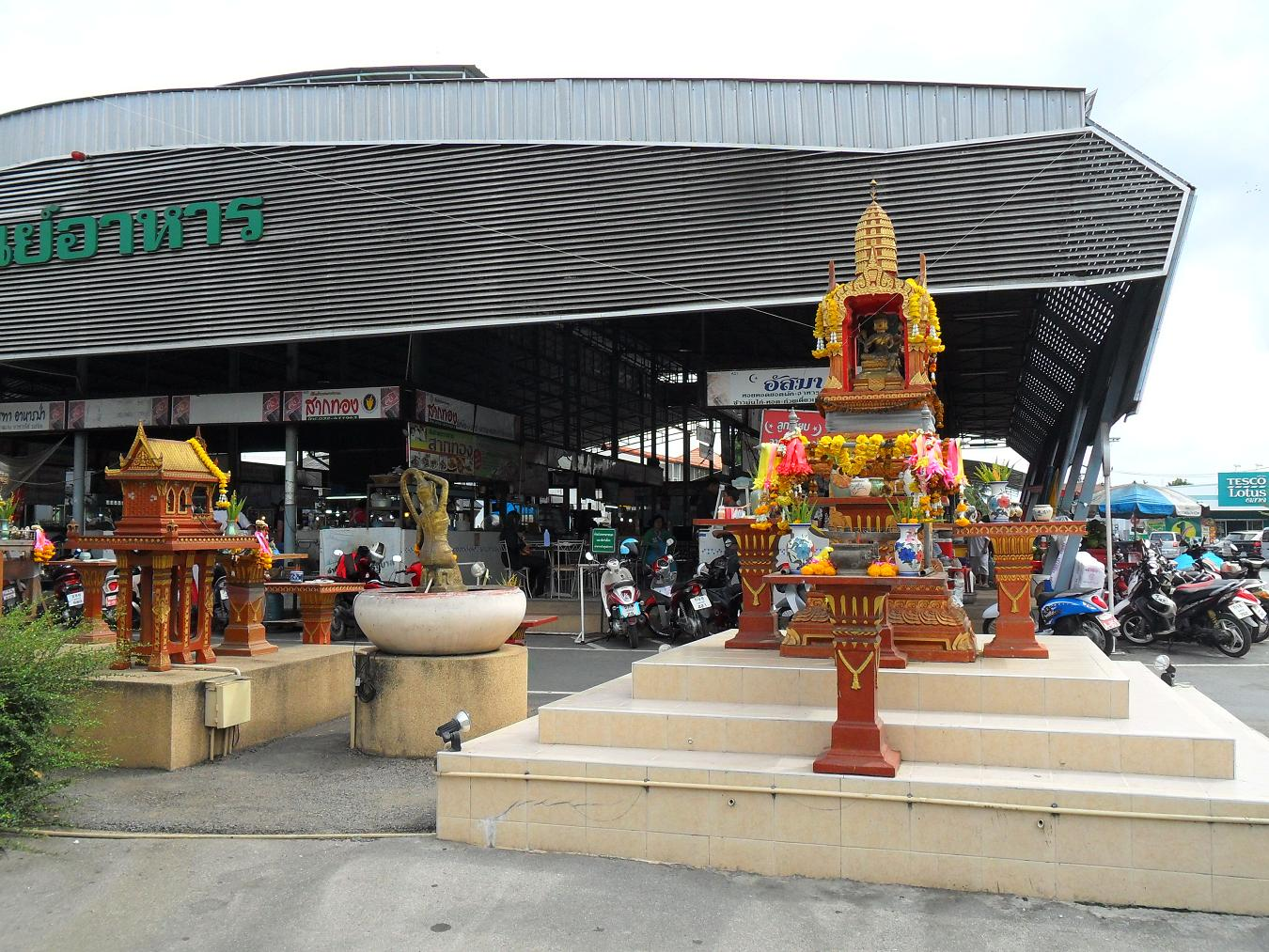
Spirit houses protect a business, Thailand

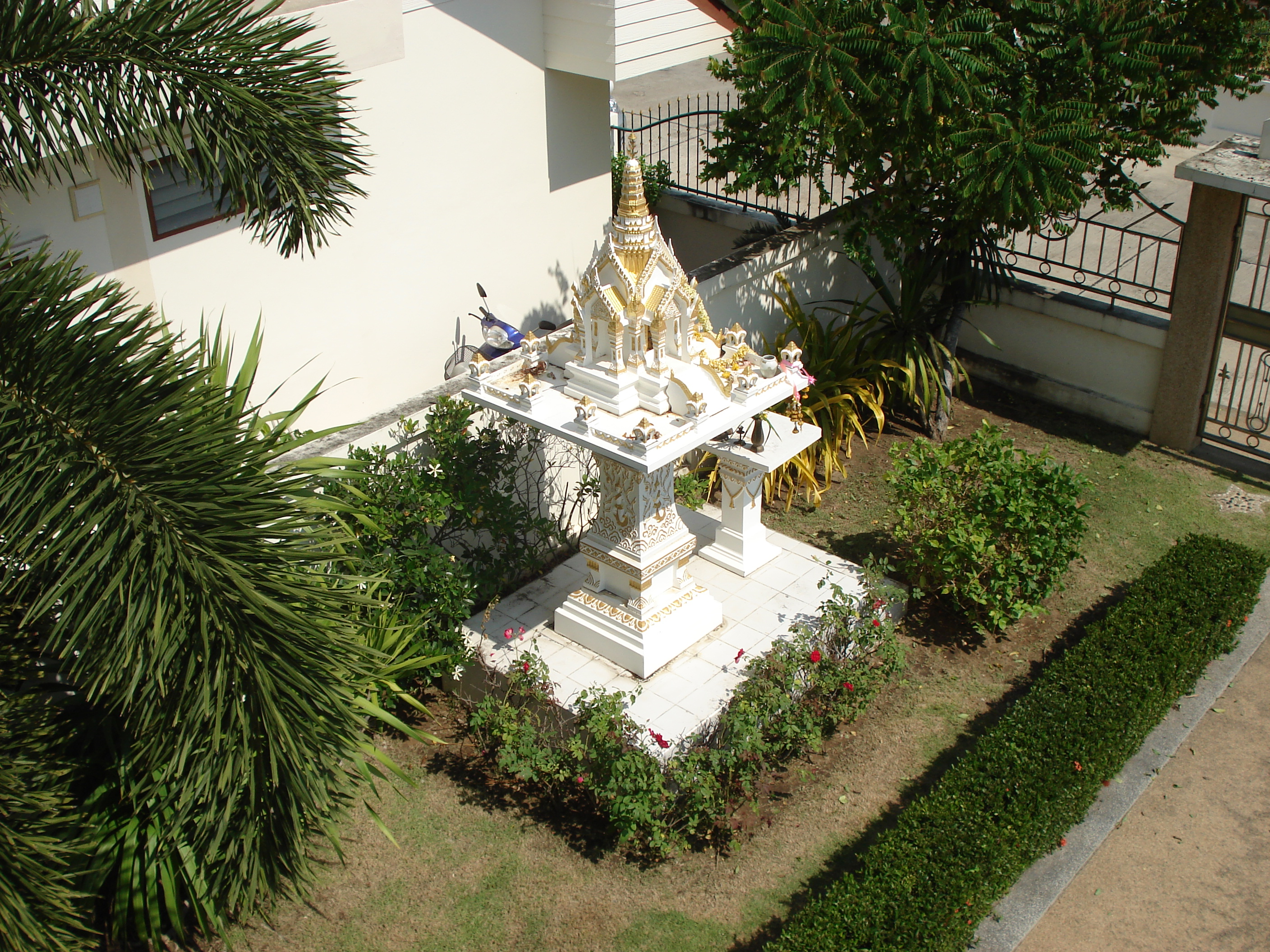
Spirit house, Hua Hin

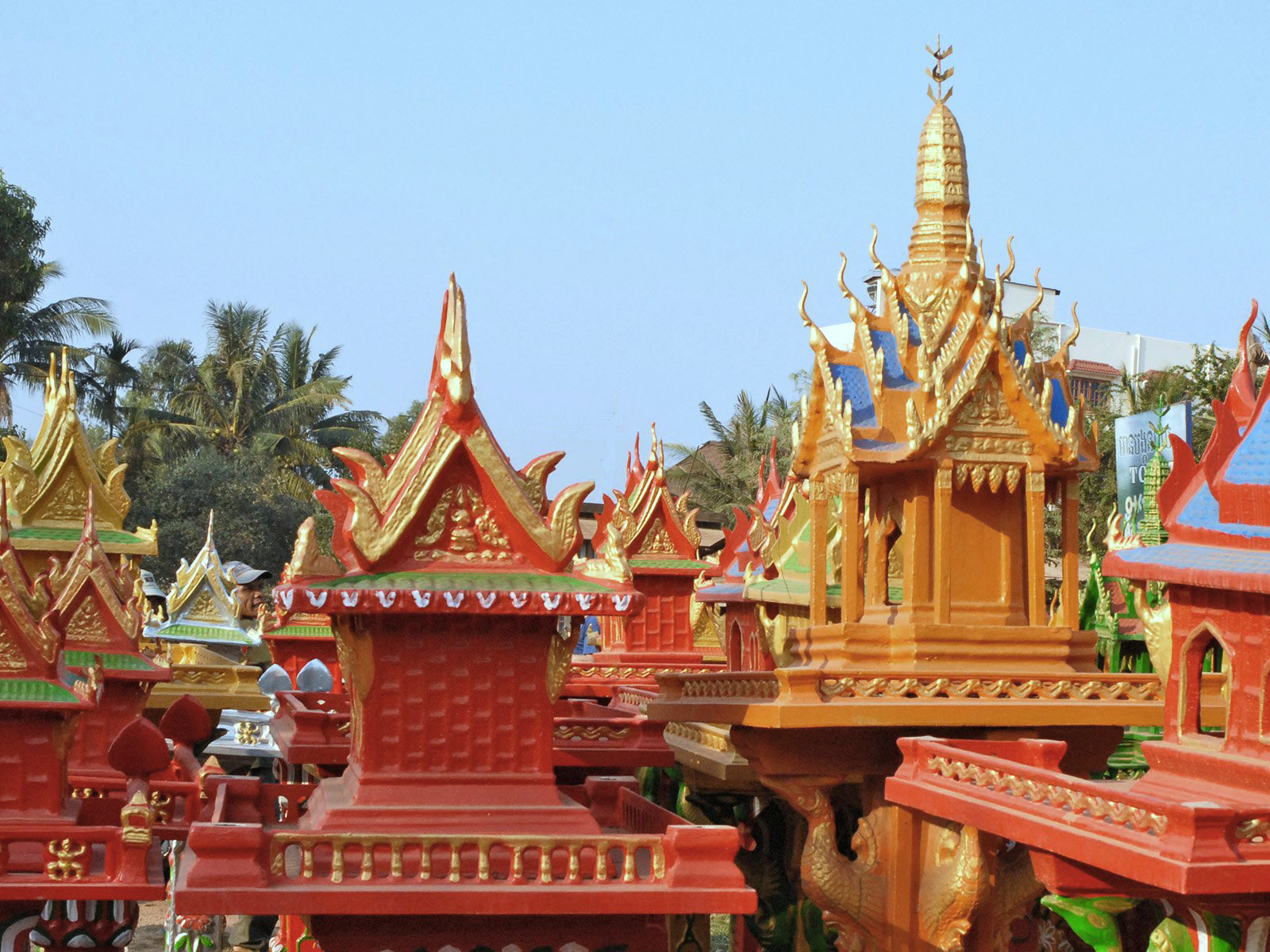
Cambodian-style spirit houses.

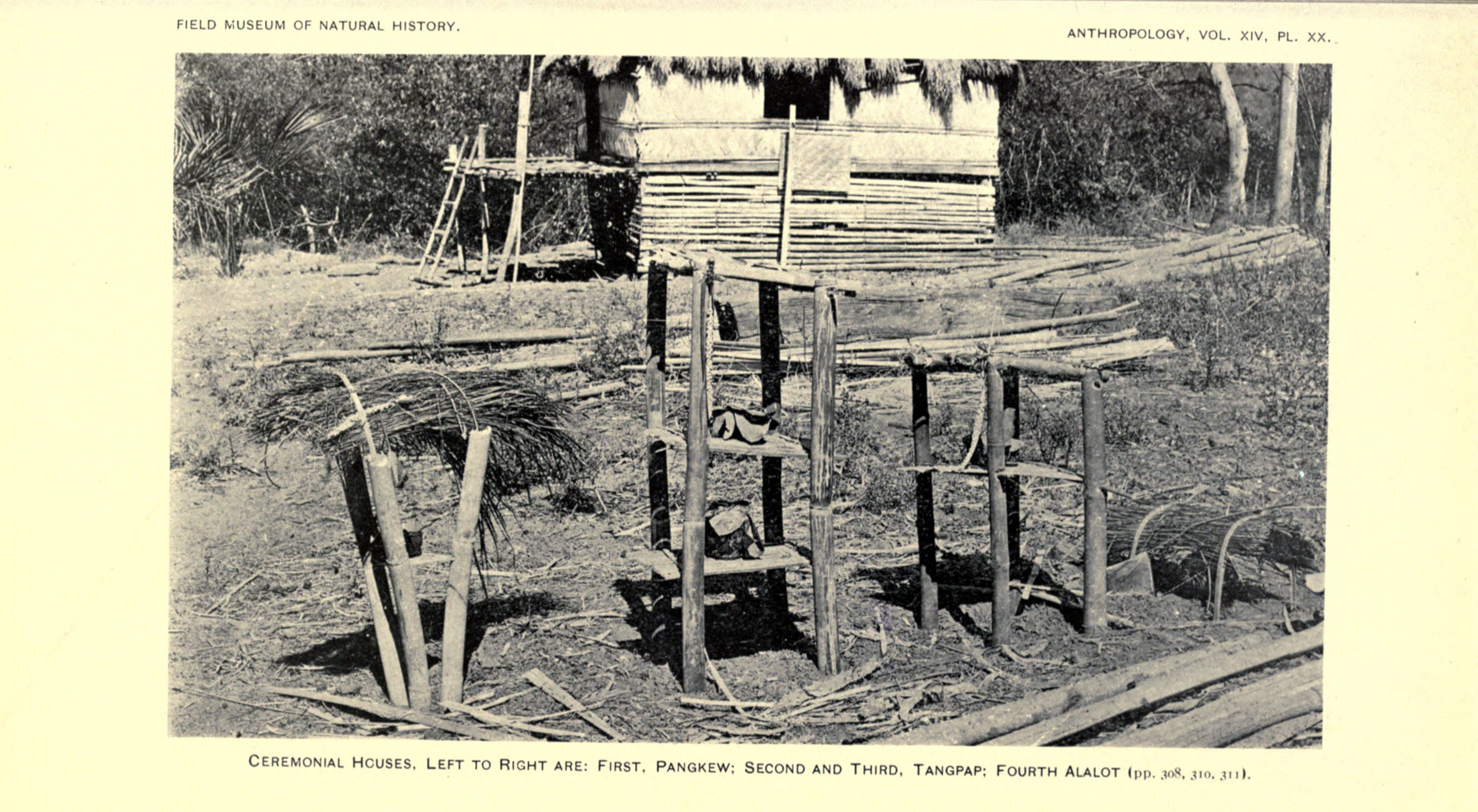
Ceremonial spirit houses among the Itneg (lef to right) the pangkew, two tangpap, and an alalot (1922, Philippines)

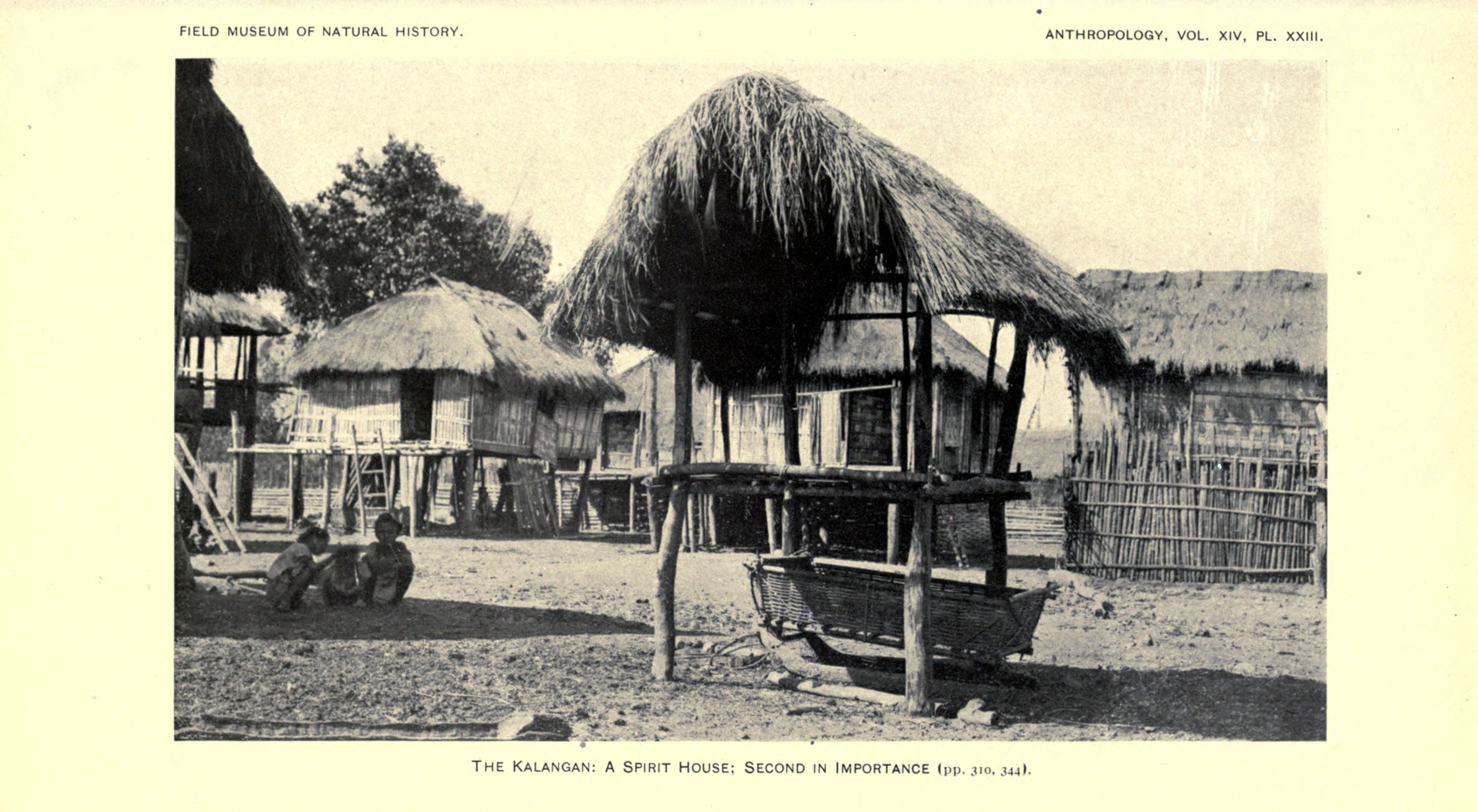
Kalangan spirit house, Itneg people (1922, Philippines)

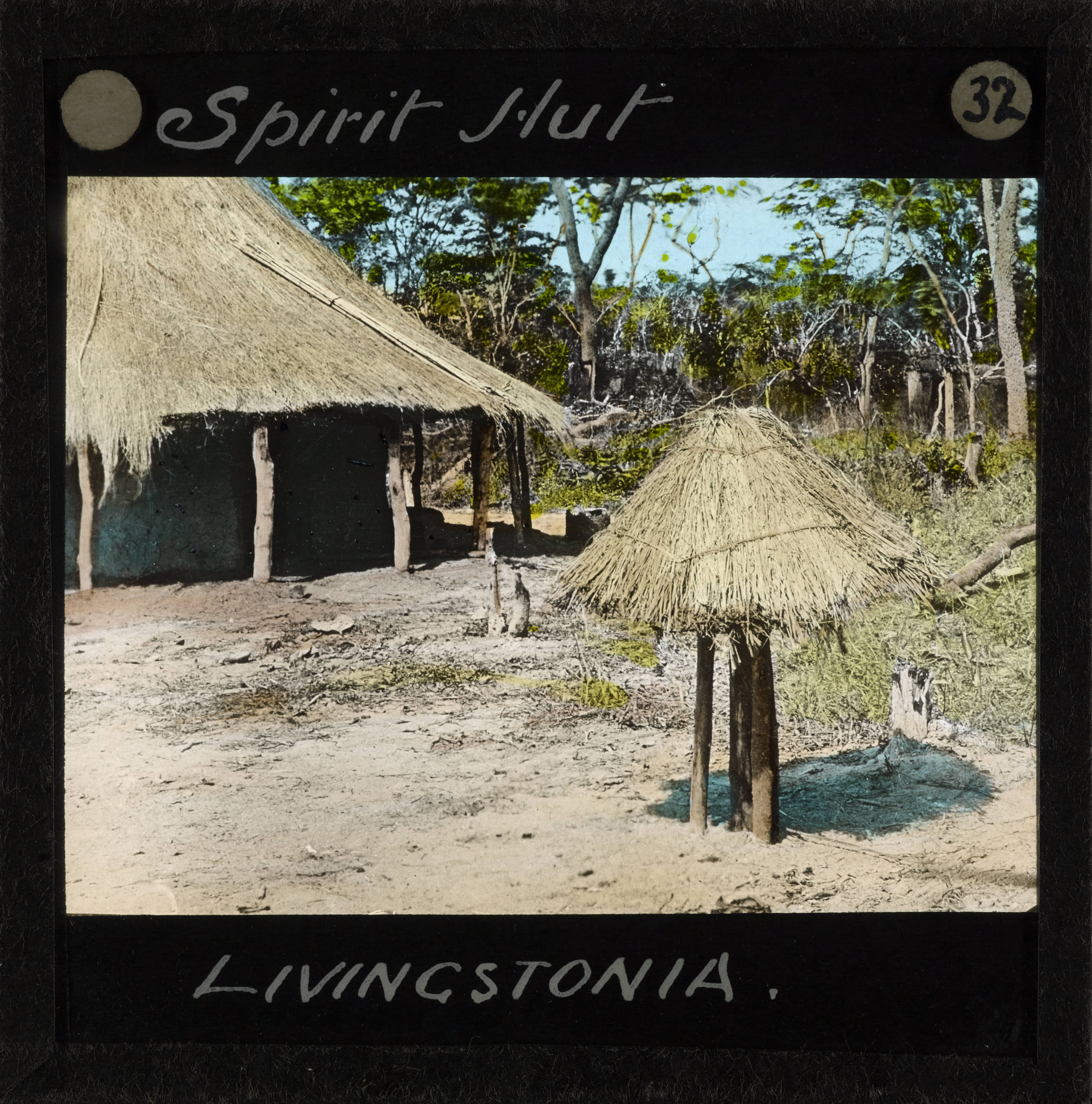
A spirit house in Livingstonia, Malawi (c. 1910)

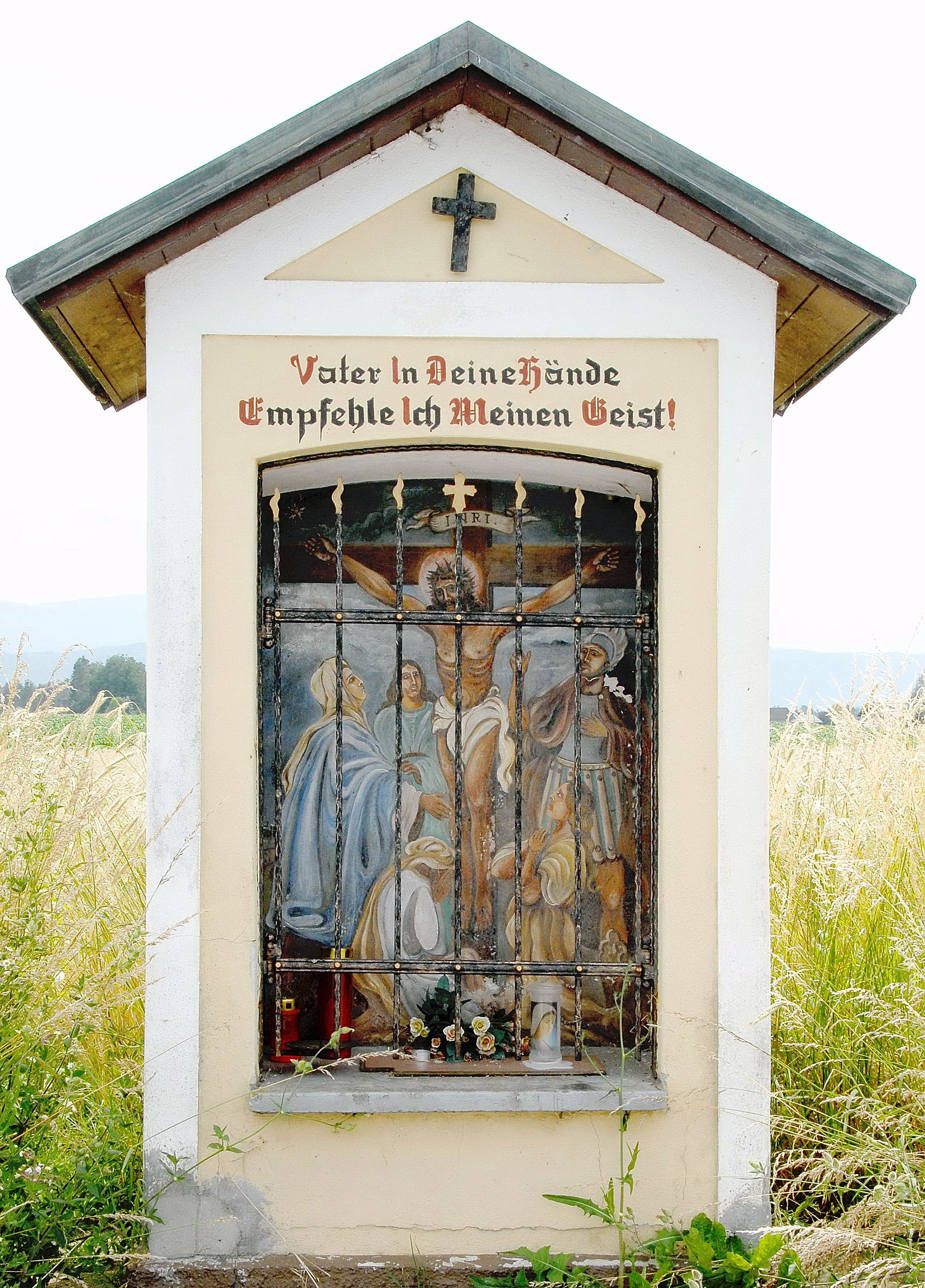
A shrine to the east of Pubersdorf in Austria

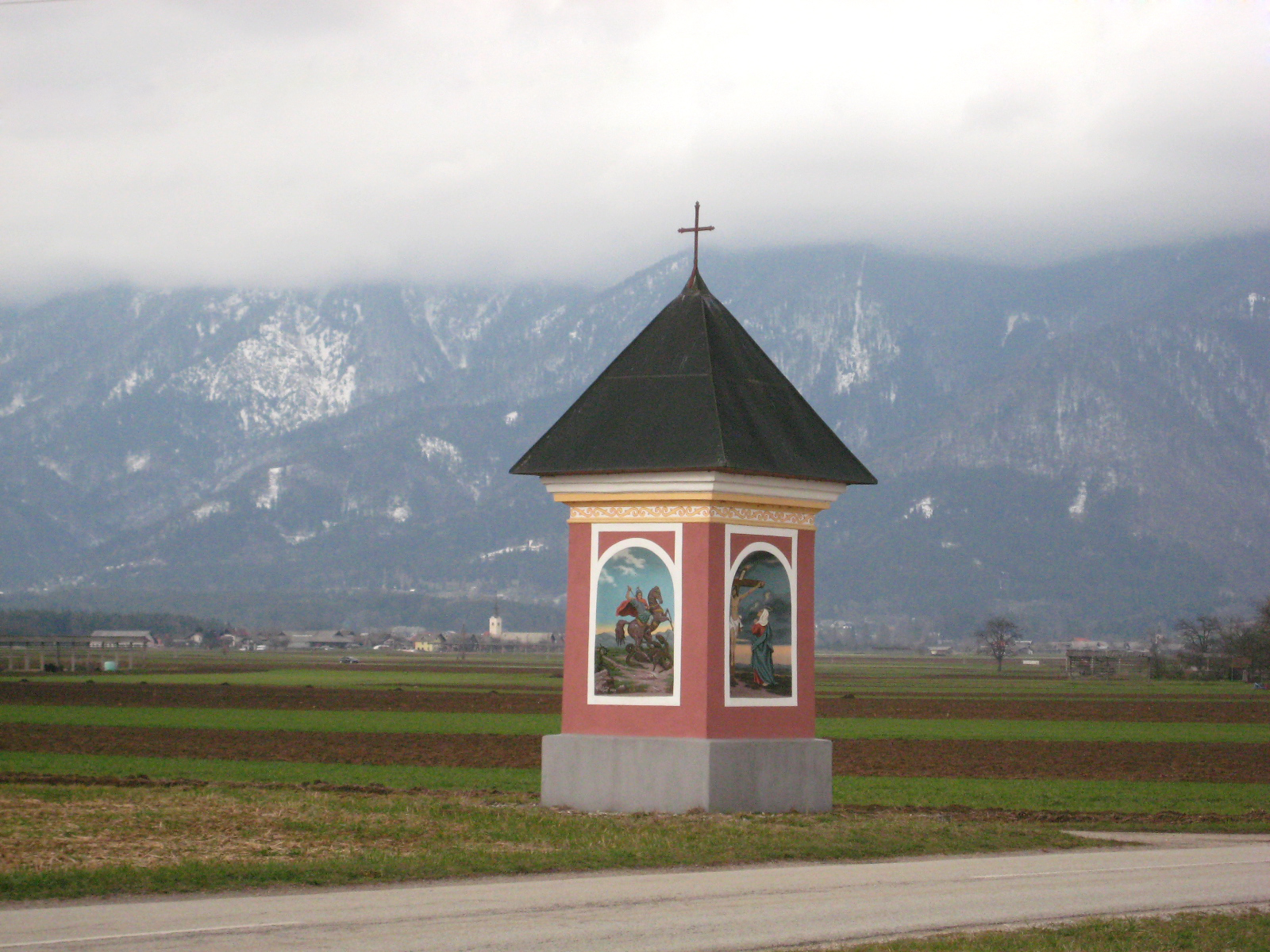
A shrine near Luže in Slovenia

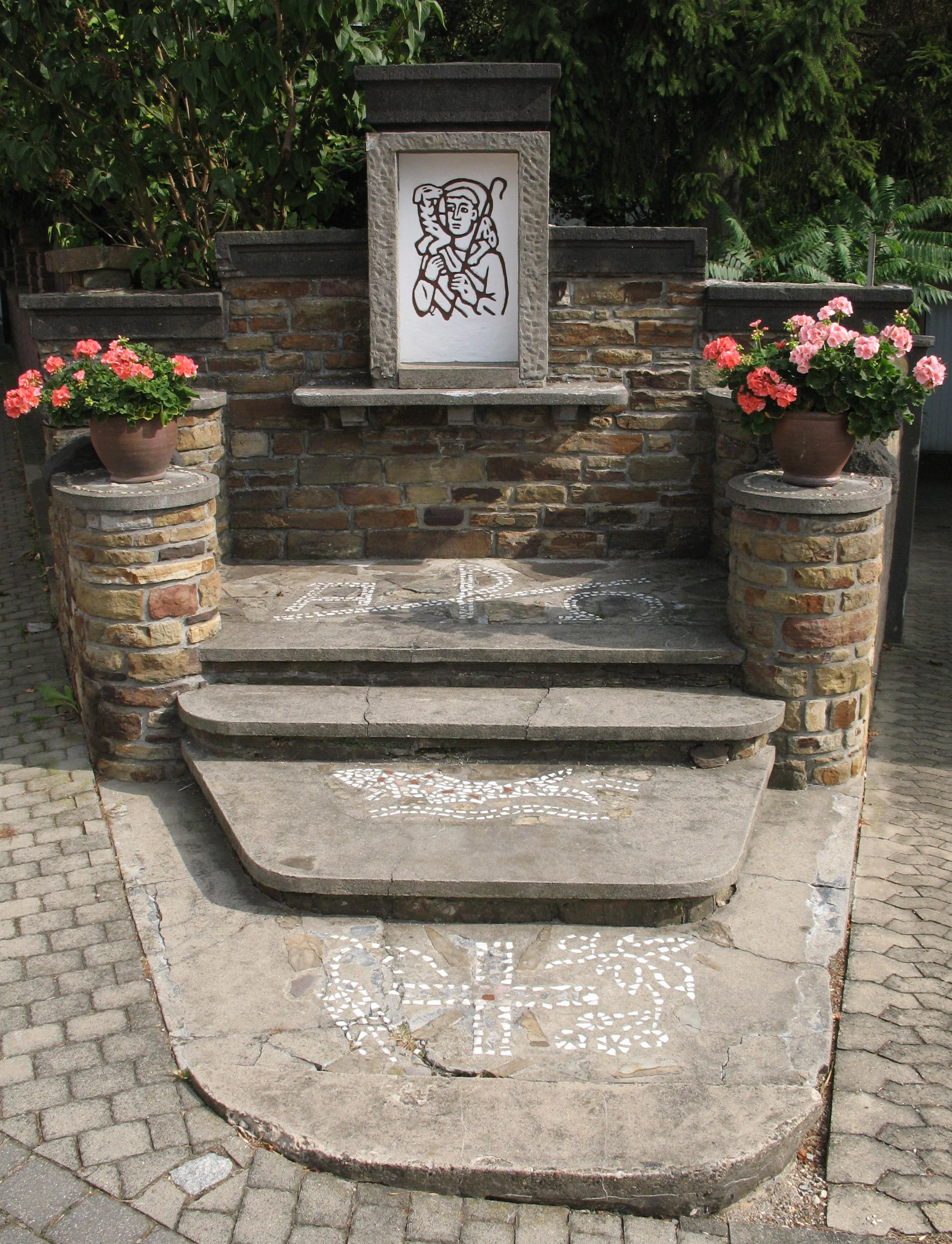
A shrine in Waldorf in Germany

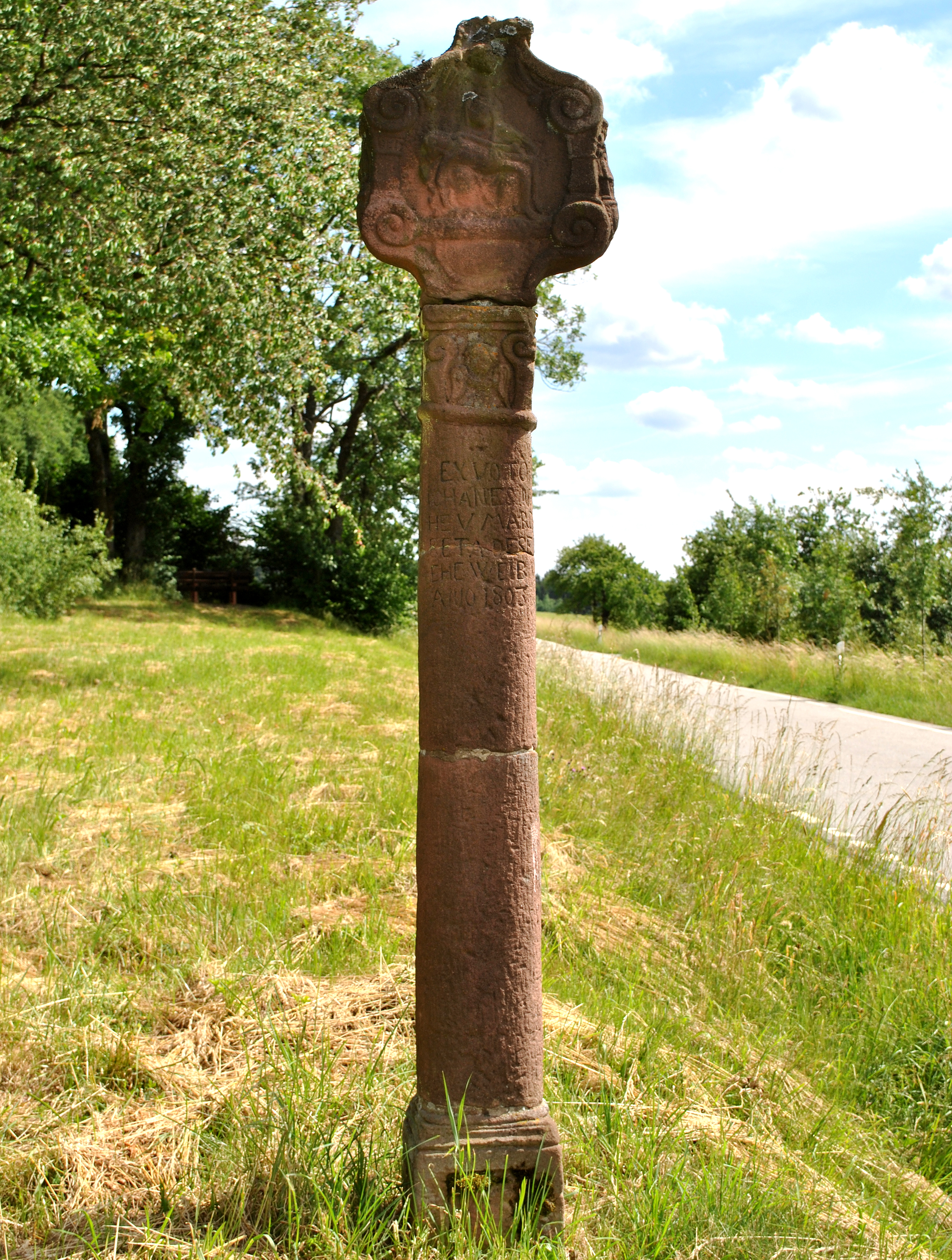
A shrine in Hesselbach, Germany

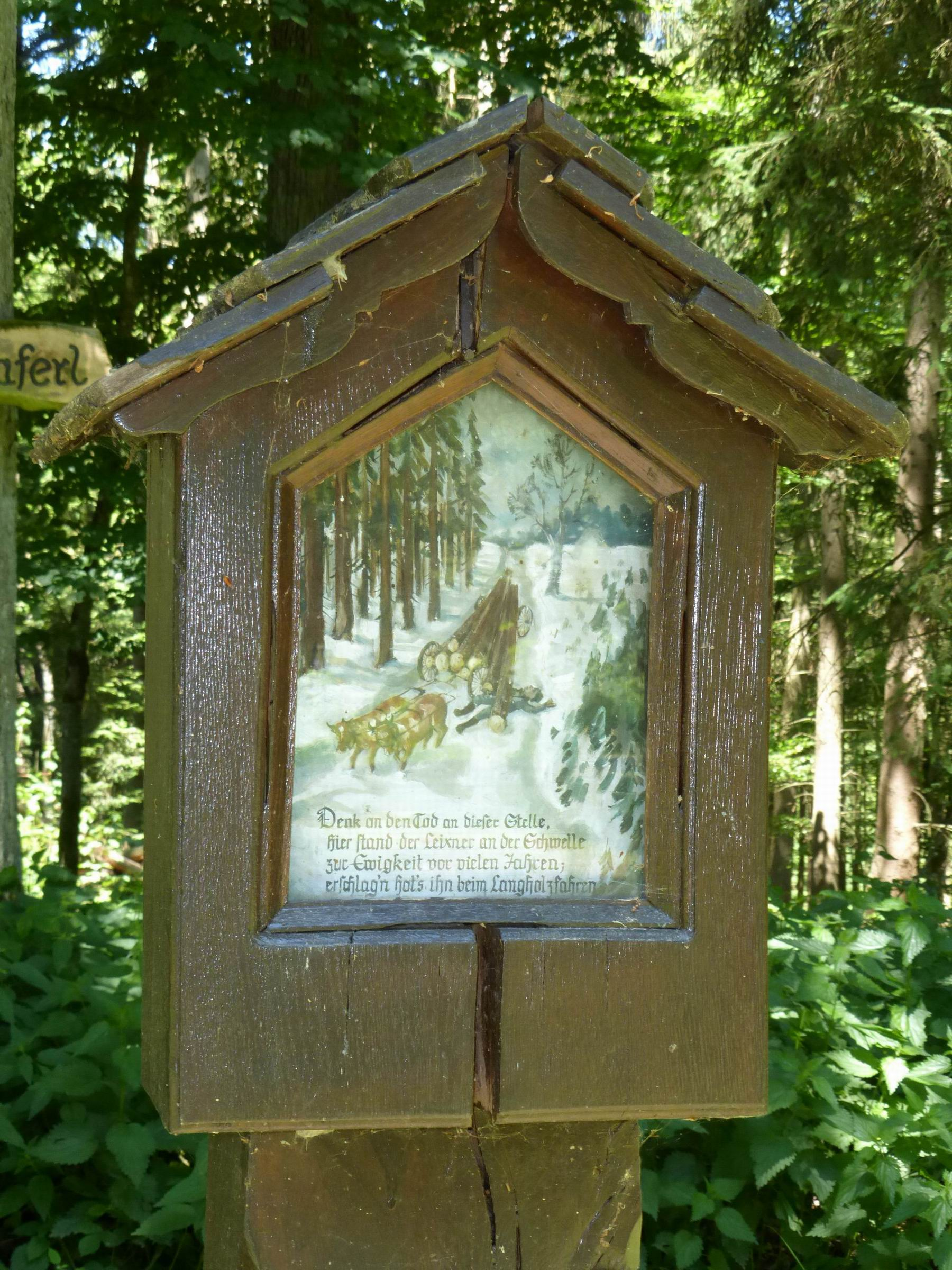
"Leixnertaferl" shrine near Neustadt an der Donau in Lower Bavaria

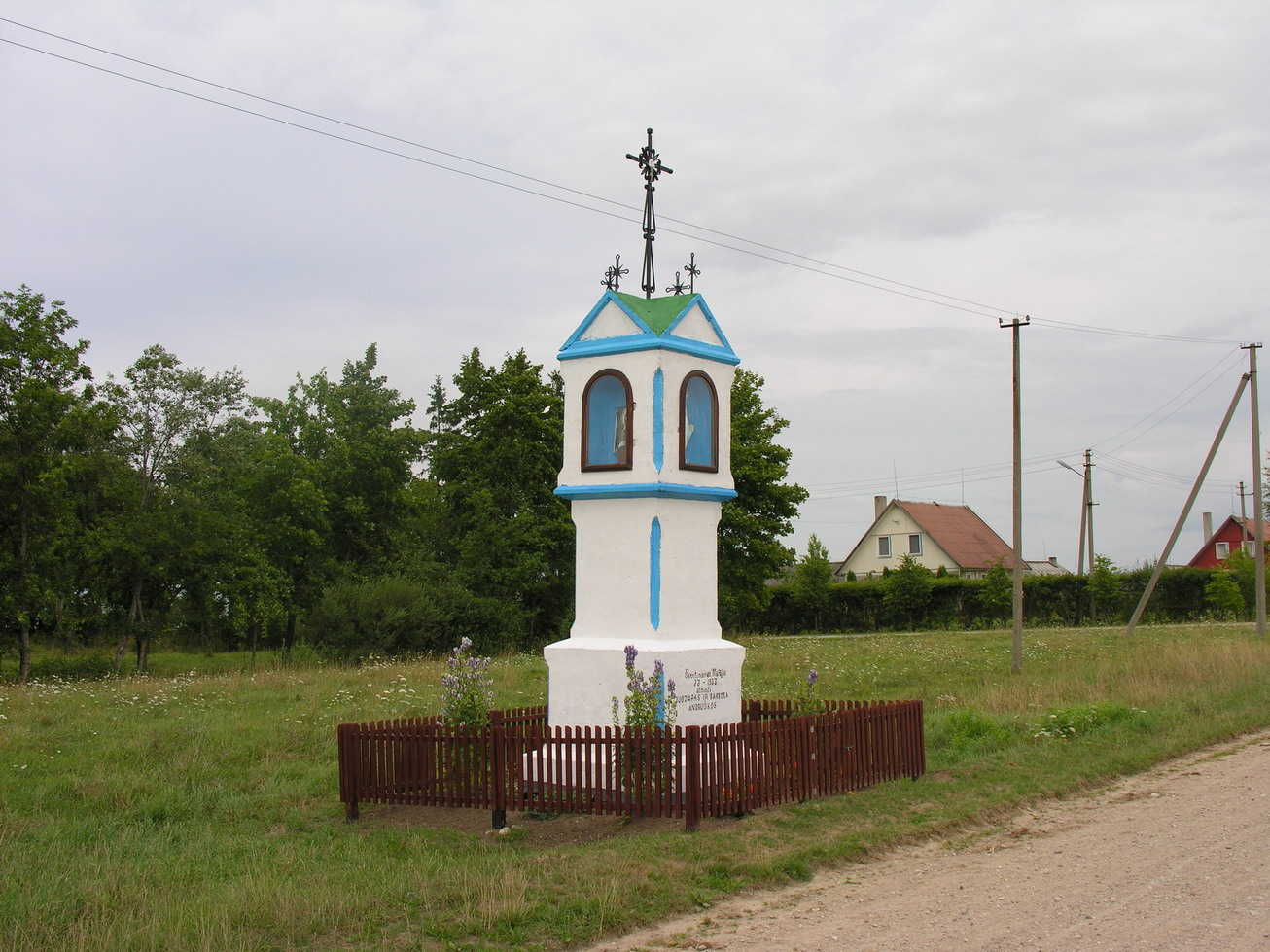
Wayside shrine by Auksūdys, Lithuania

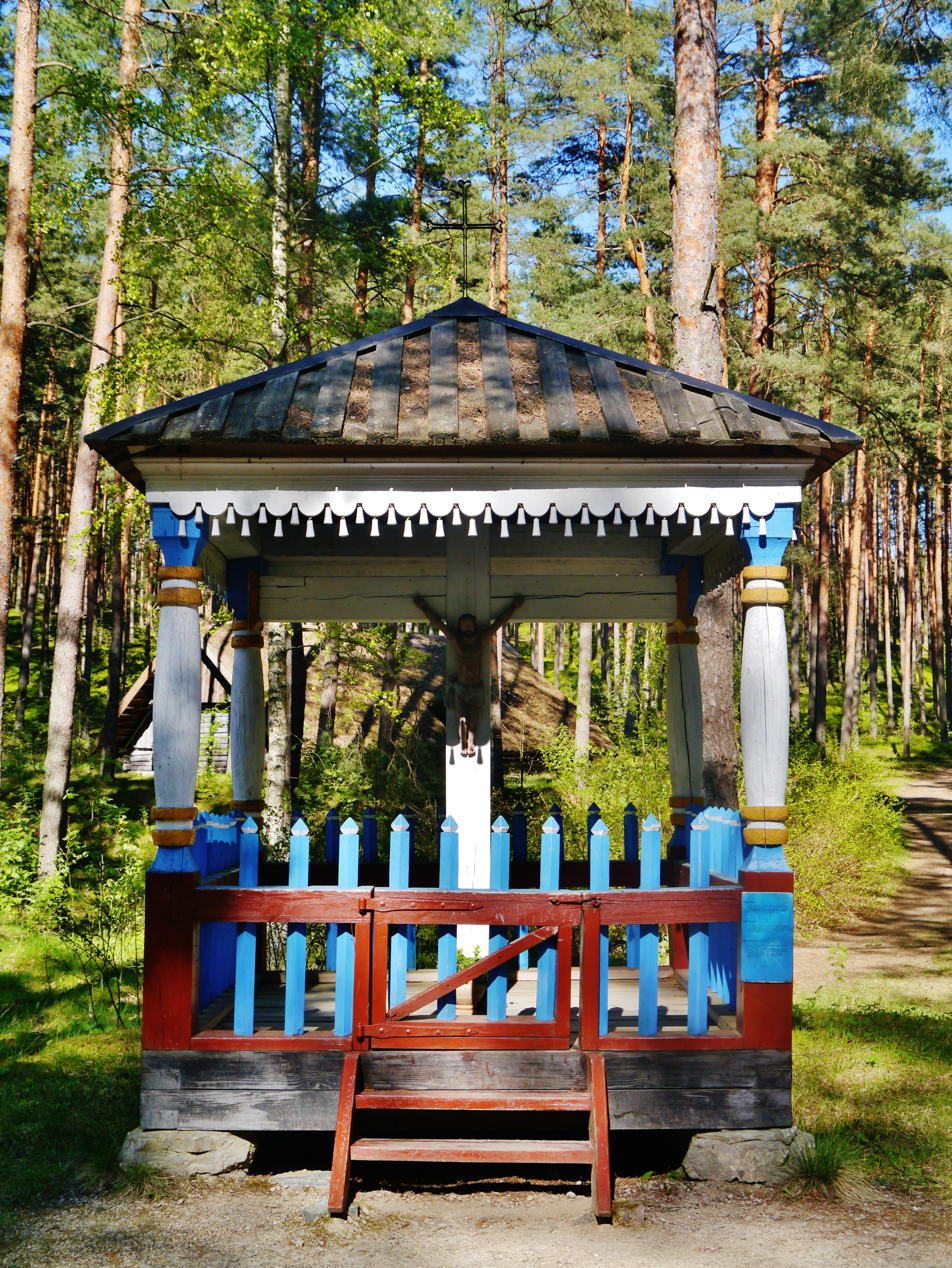
19th century Latgalian Catholic wayside shrine at The Ethnographic Open-Air Museum of Latvia

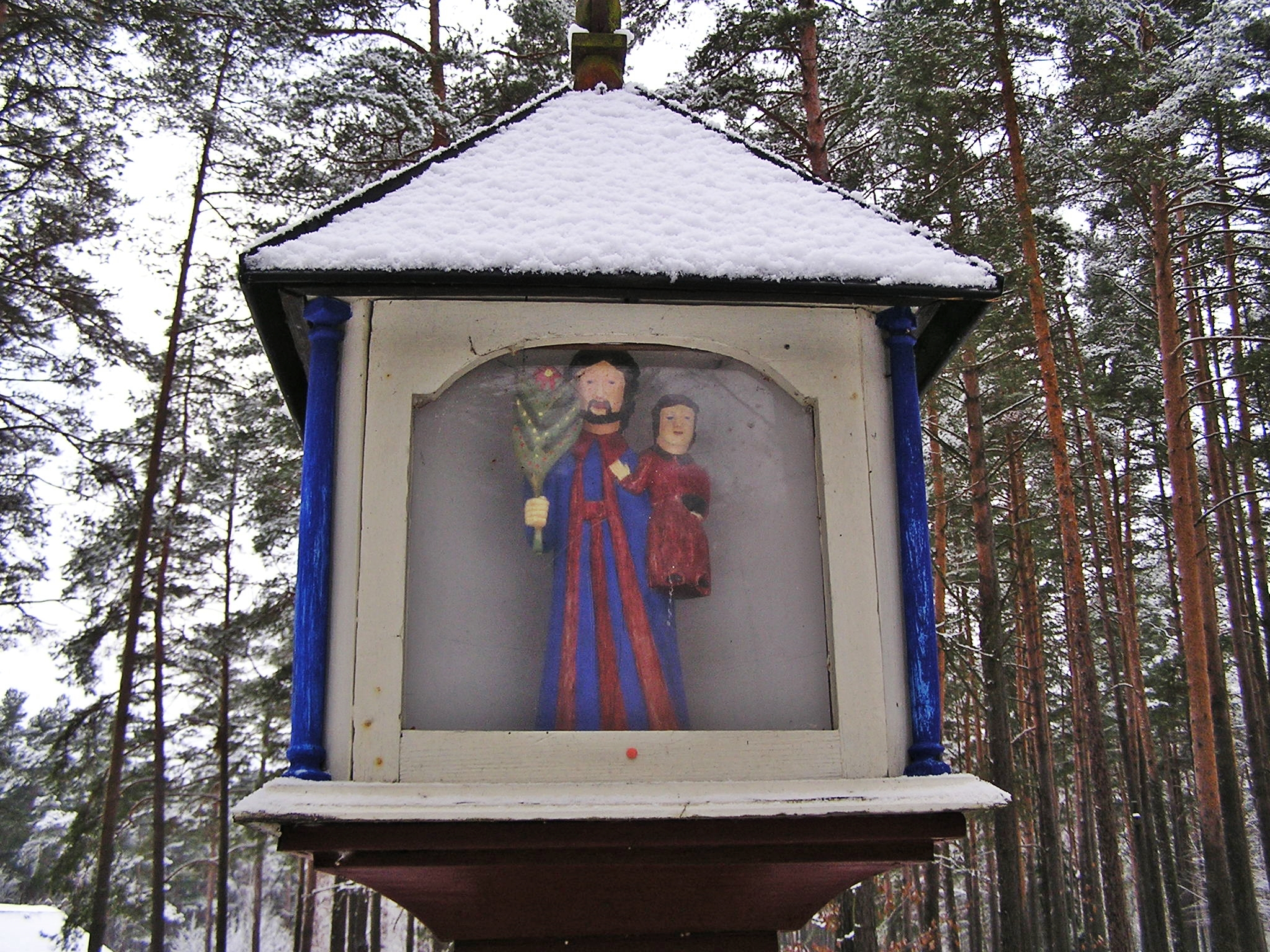
19th century Suiti Protestant column shrine from Alsunga at The Ethnographic Open-Air Museum of Latvia

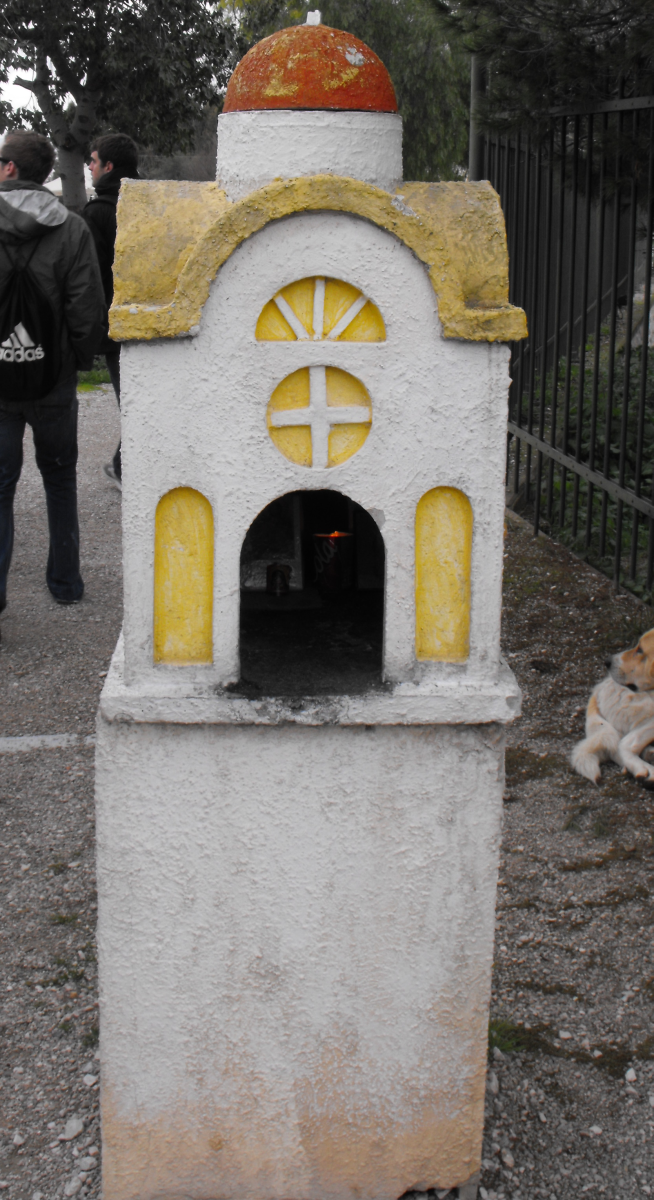
A typical, small roadside kandilakia. Athens, Greece

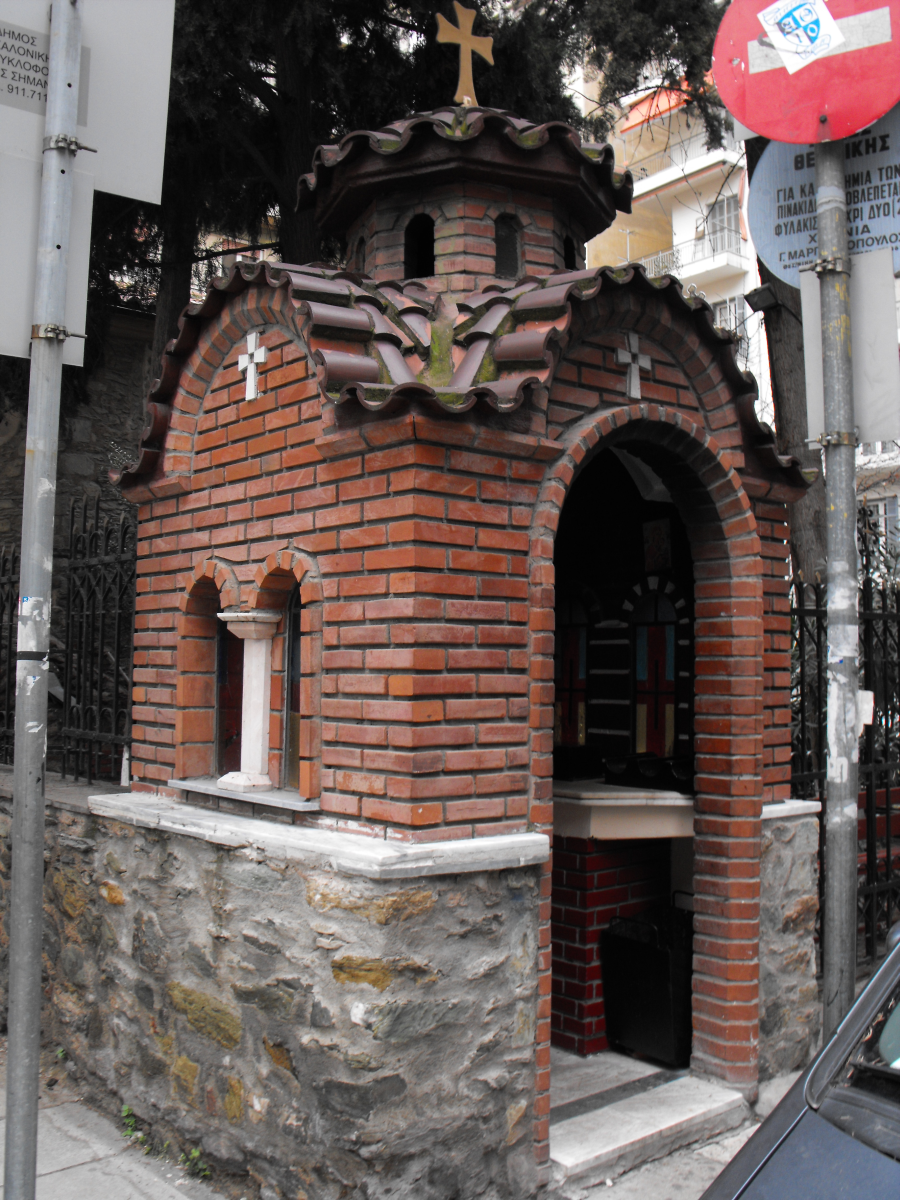
A larger kandilakia for a church in Thessaloniki, Greece

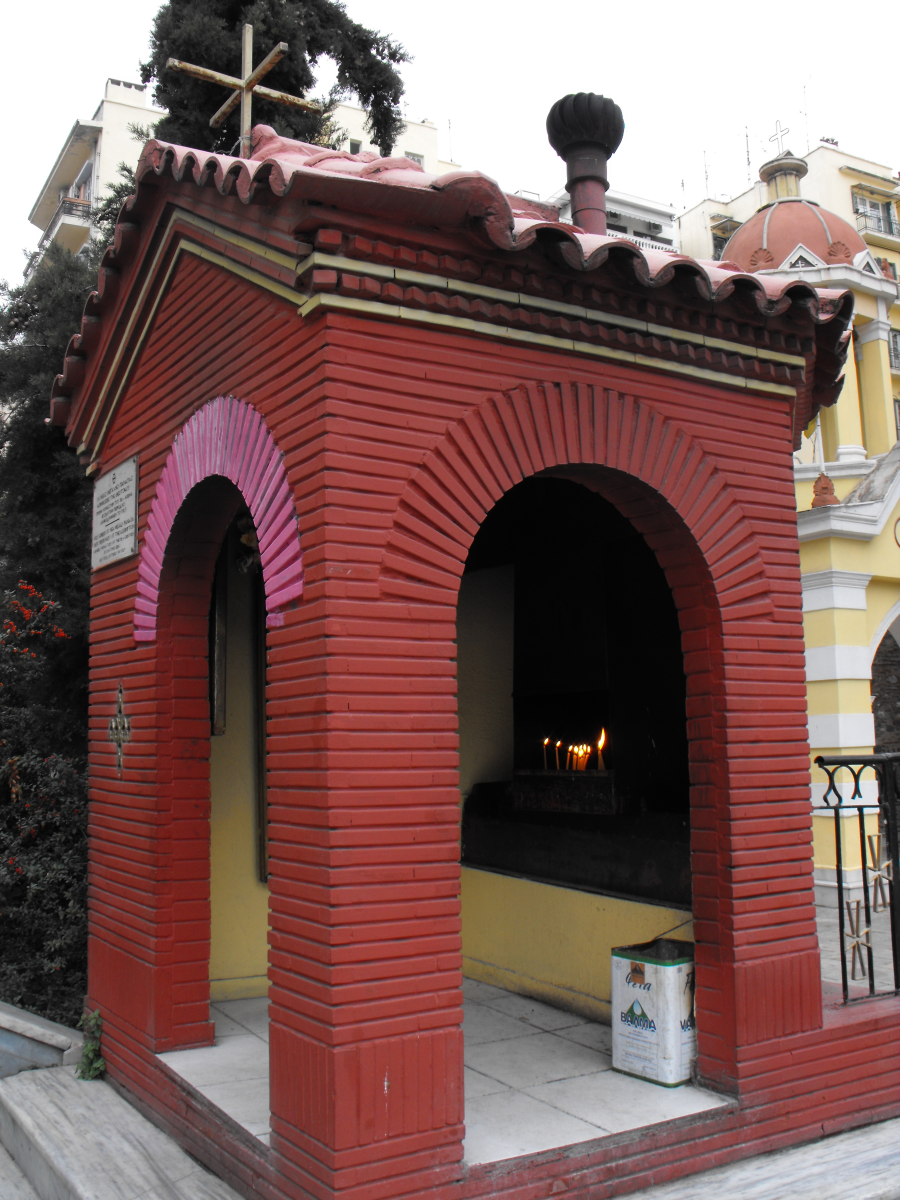
A large kandilakia for the Metropolitan Church in Thessaloniki, Greece

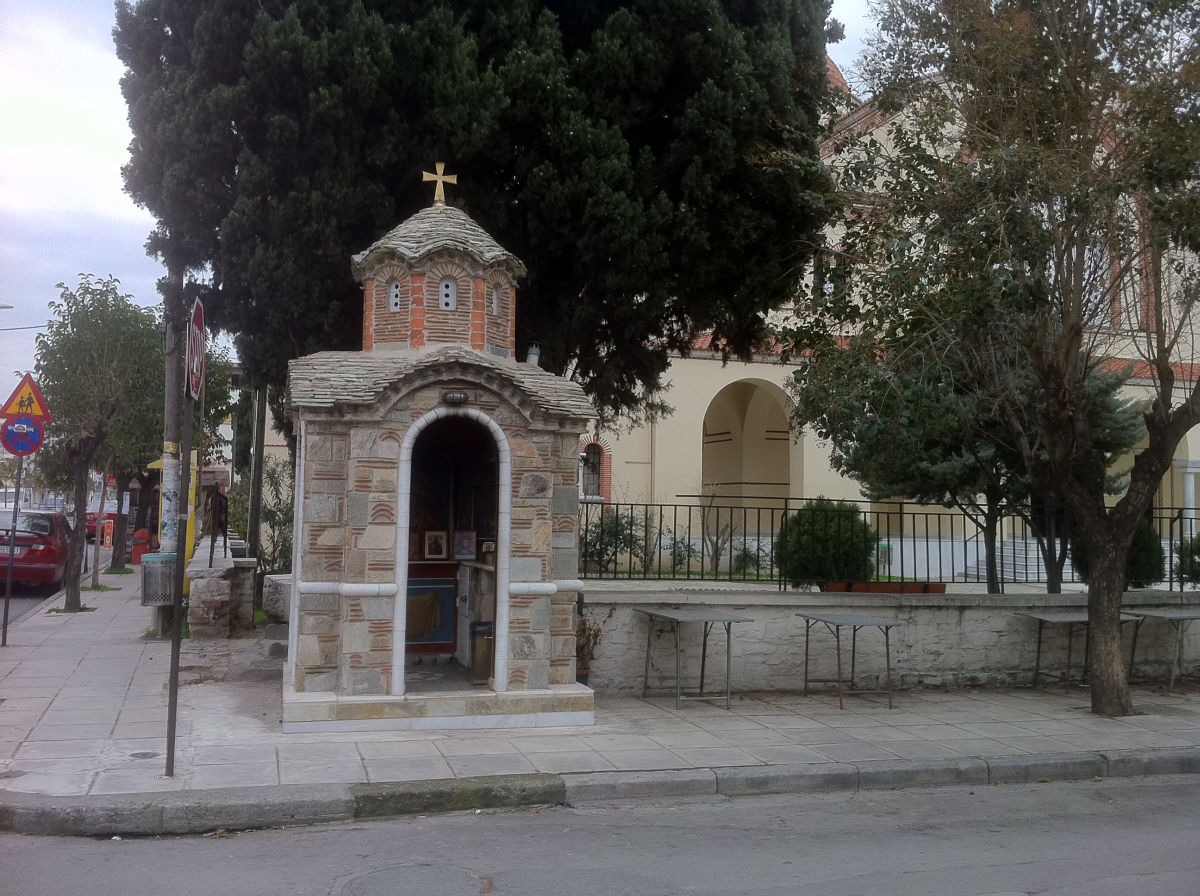
A kandilakia which serves Analipsi Church in Volos, Greece

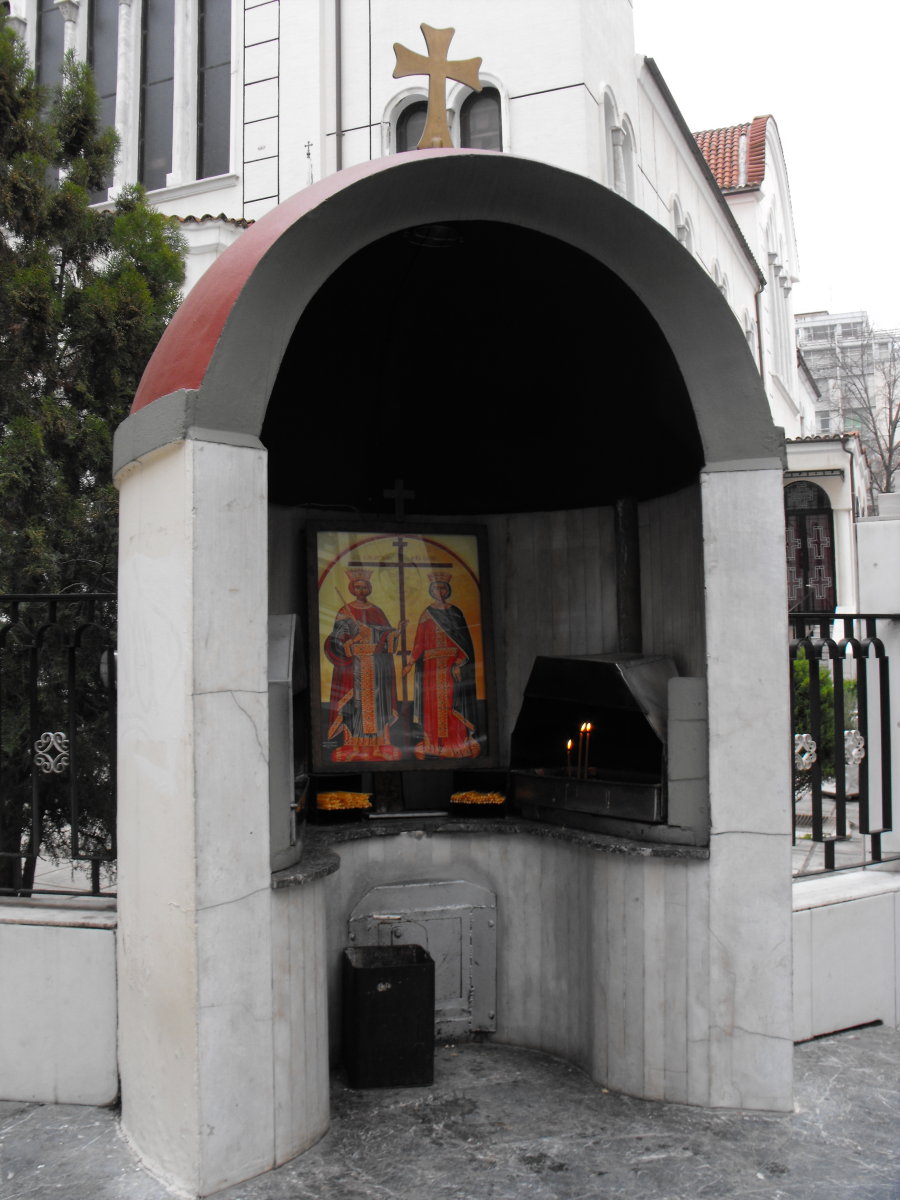
Kandilakia for Saints Constantine & Helen Church in Thessaloniki, Greece

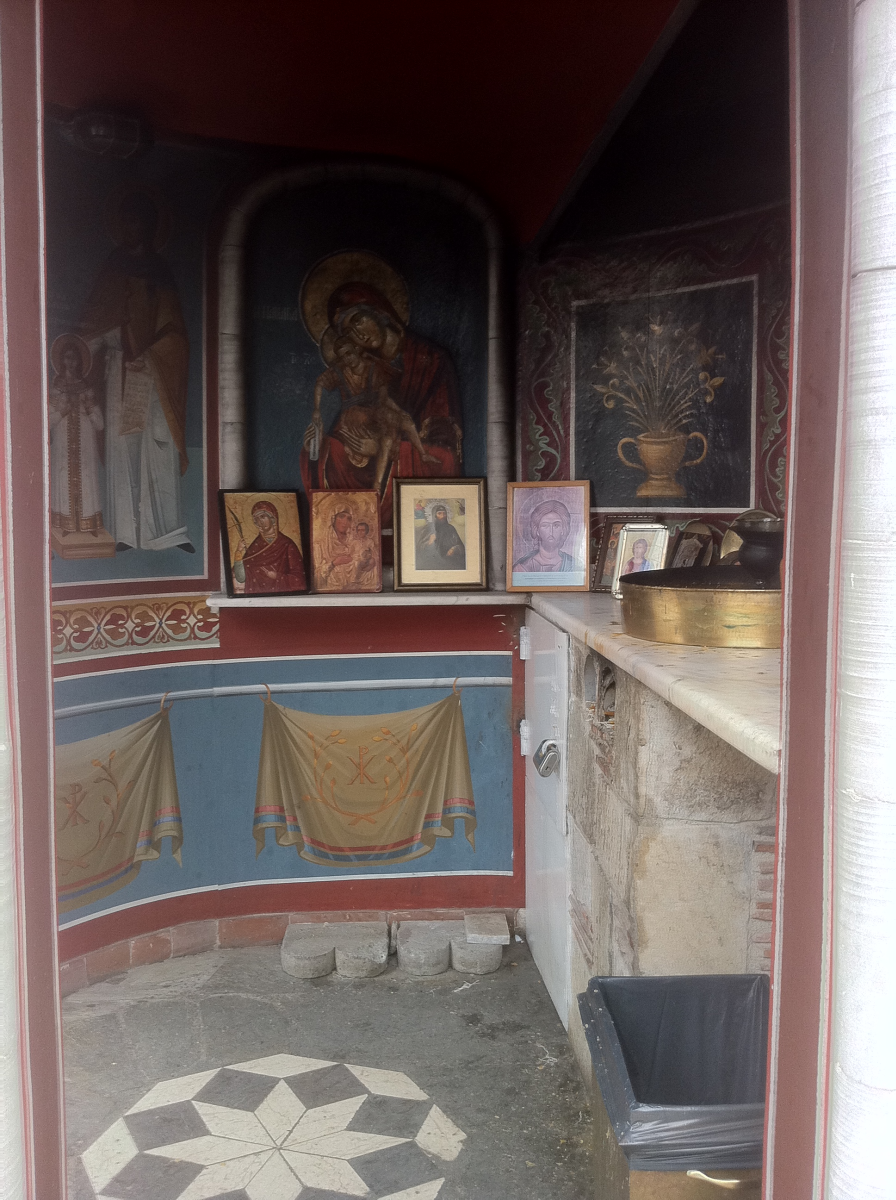
The interior of the kandilakia for Analipsi Church

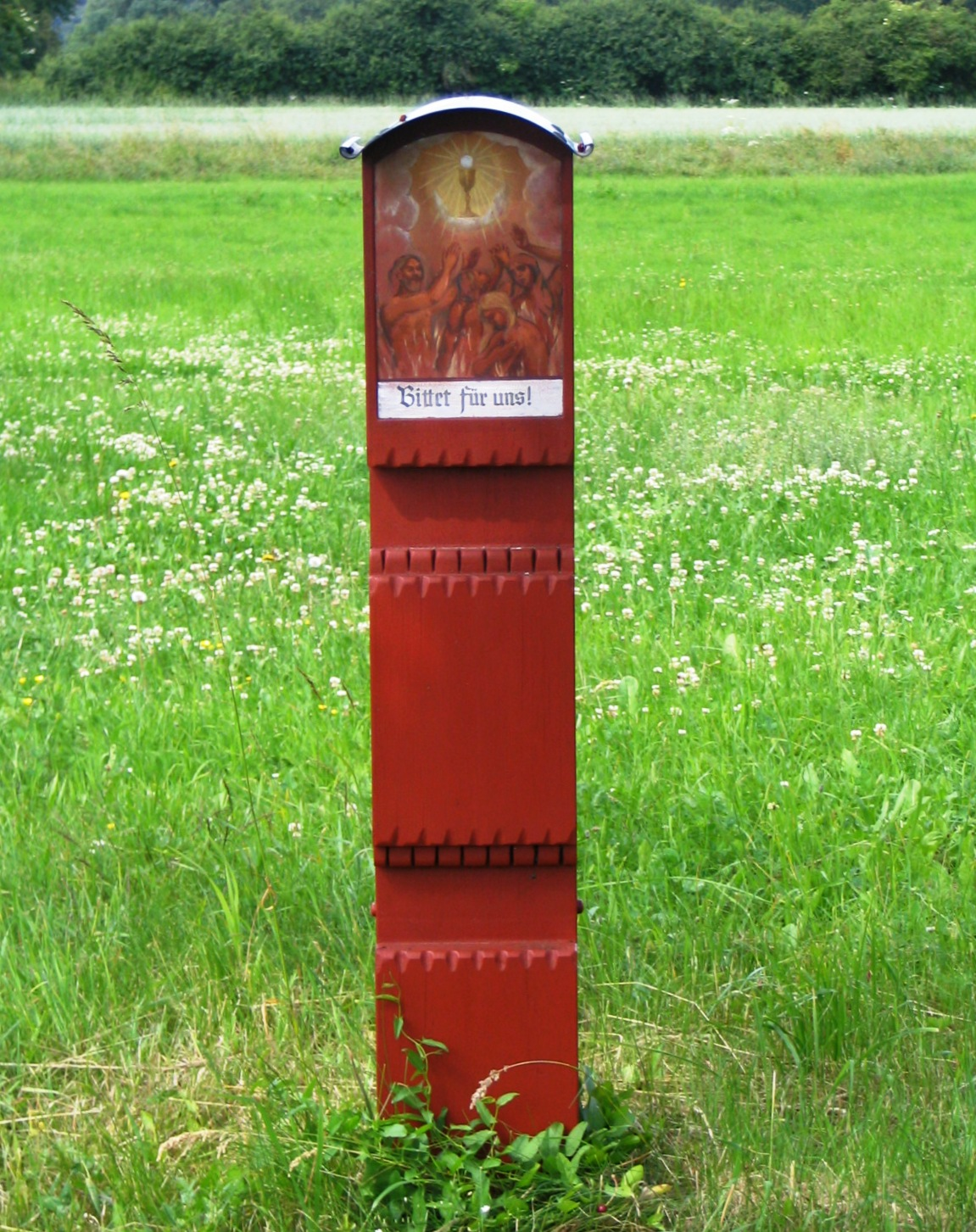
Wooden column shrine in Garsdorf, Bavaria

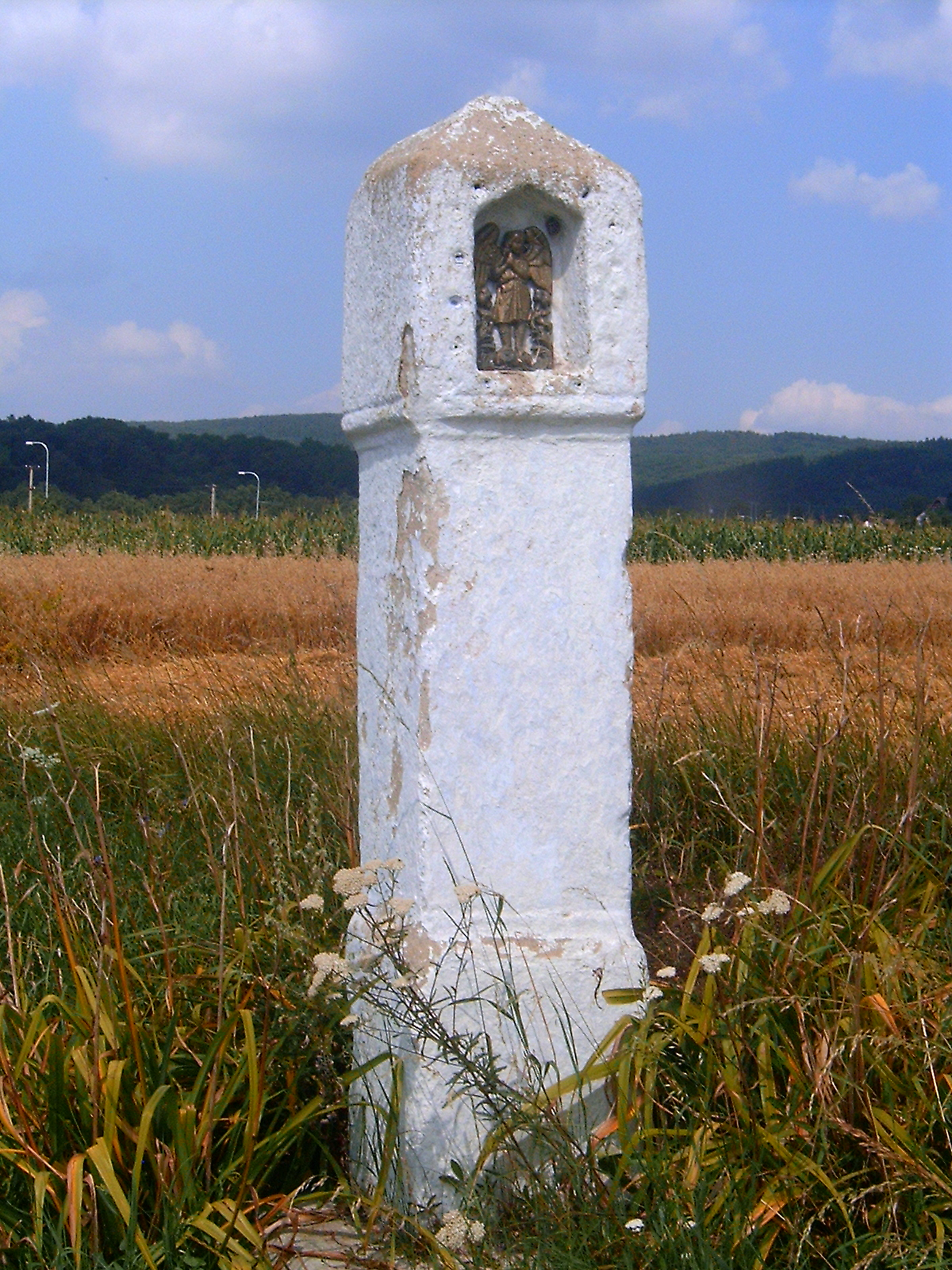
Stone column shrine in Vřesovice, Czech Republic

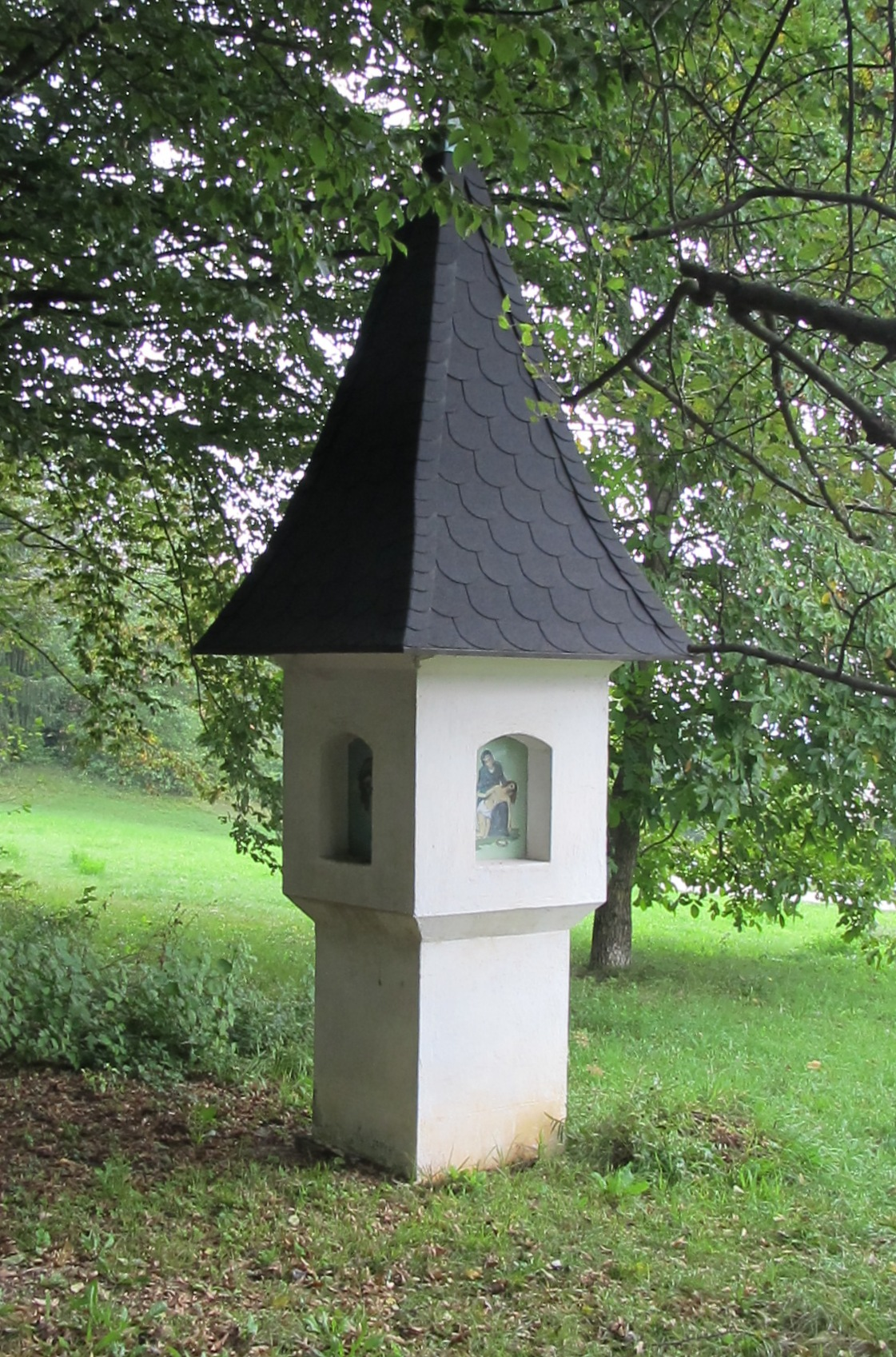
Roofed column shrine in Mali Lipoglav, Slovenia

== See also ==
- Mikoshi
