= Ikhernofret Stela =

Ancient Egyptian stela

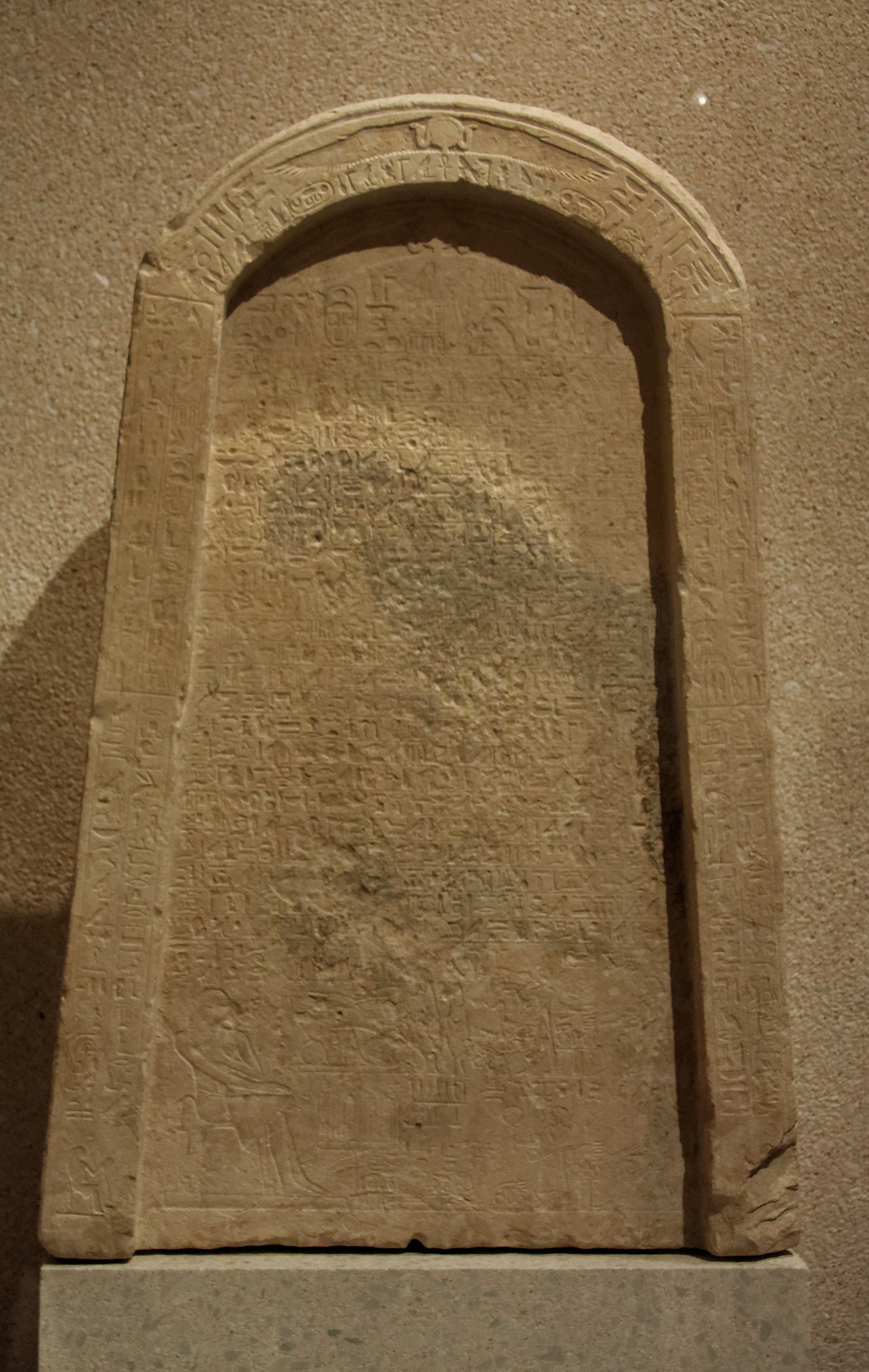
- Material: Limestone
- Height: 1 meter
- Created: c. 1864 BC
- Discovered: Egypt

The Ikhernofret Stela (Berlin Museum ref 1204) is an ancient Egyptian stela dated to the Middle Kingdom and is notable for its veiled description of how the mysteries of the deity Osiris were carried out in Abydos. The stela is 1 meter high and made of limestone. Osiris is depicted standing under a winged sun disk facing Senusret III. The text is laid out below Osiris in 24 horizontal lines. Underneath the text, Ikhernofret, a 12th Dynasty treasurer under King Senusret III, is depicted at an offering table with his family. The rituals celebrated the god's kingship, death and resurrection.

The stela describes how Ikhernofret is regarded as a beloved "foster child" of the King who was made "Companion of the King" when twenty-six. He is sent on a mission to Abydos by the King to carry out work in honour of the Kings Father "Osiris, Foremost of the Westerners".

The stela records how the festivities were celebrated in four main parts.

- Procession of Wepwawet ("The Opener of the Ways"). Wepwawet was in this instance a manifestation of the triumphant Horus who came to the aid of his father Osiris. The rite involved excoriation rituals relating to the enemies of Osiris.
- Great Procession. Leaving the Temple of Osiris, a re-enactment of the funeral procession of Osiris in the Neshmet-Barque.
- Haker Festival ("The Night of the Battling Horus"). The acting out of the battle between Horus and Set.
- Procession to the Temple of Osiris. Osiris returns to the Temple, symbolising resurrection and the triumph over death.

The Egyptologist and novelist Christian Jacq used the Ikehernofret inscriptions as the foundation of his Osirian series "The Mysteries of Osiris".

== See also ==
- Osiris myth
- Ancient Egyptian religion
- Mysteries of Osiris
