= Ikhernofret =

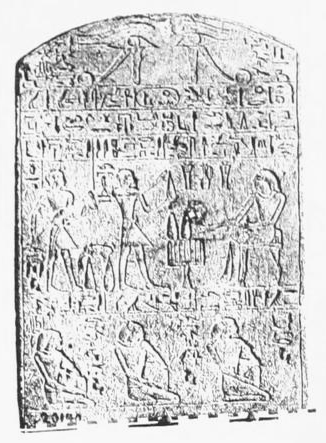
A funerary stela of Ikhernofret from Abydos, now at the Cairo Museum (CG 20140)

ii Xr nfr f&r&t
Ikhernofret
in hieroglyphs
Era: Middle Kingdom
(2055–1650 BC)

Ikhernofret (also Iykhernofert) was an ancient Egyptian treasurer of the 12th Dynasty, under king Senusret III until the early years of Amenemhat III. On his monuments he bears several important titles, including overseer of the double treasury, overseer of the double gold house, royal sealer and his main title treasurer. Ihkernofret is known from several stelae found at Abydos. One of these stelae contains a biography. This stela is now in the Egyptian Museum of Berlin (Stela Berlin 1204). According to its text, Ikhernofret grew up at the royal court. When he was 26, he became friend of the king, which was most likely a special honor. However, the text of the stela is of special importance as it reports the arrangement by Ikhernofret of a festival for Osiris at Abydos.

Not much is known about the family of Ikhernofret. His mother was called Zatkhons, while his father is not mentioned on his monuments. Ikhernofret appears on several stelae and it is possible to reconstruct from there a network of people around this high official.
